

362001–362100 

|-bgcolor=#fefefe
| 362001 ||  || — || October 20, 2008 || Mount Lemmon || Mount Lemmon Survey || — || align=right data-sort-value="0.62" | 620 m || 
|-id=002 bgcolor=#fefefe
| 362002 ||  || — || October 22, 2008 || Kitt Peak || Spacewatch || — || align=right data-sort-value="0.77" | 770 m || 
|-id=003 bgcolor=#fefefe
| 362003 ||  || — || December 6, 2005 || Kitt Peak || Spacewatch || — || align=right data-sort-value="0.47" | 470 m || 
|-id=004 bgcolor=#fefefe
| 362004 ||  || — || September 22, 2008 || Mount Lemmon || Mount Lemmon Survey || — || align=right data-sort-value="0.73" | 730 m || 
|-id=005 bgcolor=#fefefe
| 362005 ||  || — || October 26, 2008 || Catalina || CSS || — || align=right | 1.2 km || 
|-id=006 bgcolor=#fefefe
| 362006 ||  || — || October 29, 2008 || Kitt Peak || Spacewatch || FLO || align=right data-sort-value="0.60" | 600 m || 
|-id=007 bgcolor=#fefefe
| 362007 ||  || — || November 1, 2008 || Kitt Peak || Spacewatch || — || align=right data-sort-value="0.81" | 810 m || 
|-id=008 bgcolor=#fefefe
| 362008 ||  || — || October 30, 2008 || Kitt Peak || Spacewatch || — || align=right data-sort-value="0.78" | 780 m || 
|-id=009 bgcolor=#fefefe
| 362009 ||  || — || November 6, 2008 || Mount Lemmon || Mount Lemmon Survey || — || align=right data-sort-value="0.50" | 500 m || 
|-id=010 bgcolor=#fefefe
| 362010 ||  || — || November 7, 2008 || Mount Lemmon || Mount Lemmon Survey || FLO || align=right data-sort-value="0.45" | 450 m || 
|-id=011 bgcolor=#fefefe
| 362011 ||  || — || November 19, 2008 || Mount Lemmon || Mount Lemmon Survey || — || align=right data-sort-value="0.74" | 740 m || 
|-id=012 bgcolor=#fefefe
| 362012 ||  || — || October 3, 2008 || Mount Lemmon || Mount Lemmon Survey || — || align=right data-sort-value="0.82" | 820 m || 
|-id=013 bgcolor=#fefefe
| 362013 ||  || — || November 30, 2008 || Kitt Peak || Spacewatch || FLO || align=right data-sort-value="0.57" | 570 m || 
|-id=014 bgcolor=#fefefe
| 362014 ||  || — || November 24, 2008 || Mount Lemmon || Mount Lemmon Survey || NYS || align=right data-sort-value="0.60" | 600 m || 
|-id=015 bgcolor=#fefefe
| 362015 ||  || — || November 18, 2008 || Kitt Peak || Spacewatch || — || align=right data-sort-value="0.98" | 980 m || 
|-id=016 bgcolor=#fefefe
| 362016 ||  || — || November 20, 2008 || Mount Lemmon || Mount Lemmon Survey || — || align=right data-sort-value="0.94" | 940 m || 
|-id=017 bgcolor=#fefefe
| 362017 ||  || — || October 25, 2008 || Kitt Peak || Spacewatch || FLO || align=right data-sort-value="0.66" | 660 m || 
|-id=018 bgcolor=#fefefe
| 362018 ||  || — || December 21, 2008 || Kitt Peak || Spacewatch || — || align=right data-sort-value="0.96" | 960 m || 
|-id=019 bgcolor=#fefefe
| 362019 ||  || — || December 21, 2008 || Mount Lemmon || Mount Lemmon Survey || MAS || align=right data-sort-value="0.75" | 750 m || 
|-id=020 bgcolor=#fefefe
| 362020 ||  || — || December 21, 2008 || Kitt Peak || Spacewatch || V || align=right data-sort-value="0.72" | 720 m || 
|-id=021 bgcolor=#fefefe
| 362021 ||  || — || December 21, 2008 || Mount Lemmon || Mount Lemmon Survey || — || align=right | 1.1 km || 
|-id=022 bgcolor=#fefefe
| 362022 ||  || — || December 21, 2008 || Mount Lemmon || Mount Lemmon Survey || — || align=right data-sort-value="0.81" | 810 m || 
|-id=023 bgcolor=#fefefe
| 362023 ||  || — || December 29, 2008 || Kitt Peak || Spacewatch || — || align=right | 1.1 km || 
|-id=024 bgcolor=#fefefe
| 362024 ||  || — || December 29, 2008 || Mount Lemmon || Mount Lemmon Survey || ERI || align=right | 2.3 km || 
|-id=025 bgcolor=#fefefe
| 362025 ||  || — || December 30, 2008 || Mount Lemmon || Mount Lemmon Survey || NYS || align=right data-sort-value="0.60" | 600 m || 
|-id=026 bgcolor=#E9E9E9
| 362026 ||  || — || December 22, 2008 || Mount Lemmon || Mount Lemmon Survey || — || align=right | 2.4 km || 
|-id=027 bgcolor=#fefefe
| 362027 ||  || — || December 30, 2008 || Kitt Peak || Spacewatch || — || align=right data-sort-value="0.67" | 670 m || 
|-id=028 bgcolor=#fefefe
| 362028 ||  || — || September 23, 1997 || Kitt Peak || Spacewatch || — || align=right data-sort-value="0.62" | 620 m || 
|-id=029 bgcolor=#fefefe
| 362029 ||  || — || December 29, 2008 || Kitt Peak || Spacewatch || NYS || align=right data-sort-value="0.56" | 560 m || 
|-id=030 bgcolor=#fefefe
| 362030 ||  || — || December 29, 2008 || Kitt Peak || Spacewatch || — || align=right data-sort-value="0.65" | 650 m || 
|-id=031 bgcolor=#fefefe
| 362031 ||  || — || December 30, 2008 || Kitt Peak || Spacewatch || FLO || align=right data-sort-value="0.86" | 860 m || 
|-id=032 bgcolor=#fefefe
| 362032 ||  || — || October 24, 2008 || Mount Lemmon || Mount Lemmon Survey || V || align=right data-sort-value="0.62" | 620 m || 
|-id=033 bgcolor=#fefefe
| 362033 ||  || — || December 30, 2008 || Kitt Peak || Spacewatch || — || align=right data-sort-value="0.83" | 830 m || 
|-id=034 bgcolor=#fefefe
| 362034 ||  || — || December 30, 2008 || Kitt Peak || Spacewatch || — || align=right data-sort-value="0.94" | 940 m || 
|-id=035 bgcolor=#fefefe
| 362035 ||  || — || December 31, 2008 || Kitt Peak || Spacewatch || — || align=right data-sort-value="0.79" | 790 m || 
|-id=036 bgcolor=#E9E9E9
| 362036 ||  || — || December 29, 2008 || Kitt Peak || Spacewatch || MAR || align=right | 1.1 km || 
|-id=037 bgcolor=#fefefe
| 362037 ||  || — || October 7, 2004 || Kitt Peak || Spacewatch || — || align=right data-sort-value="0.74" | 740 m || 
|-id=038 bgcolor=#fefefe
| 362038 ||  || — || January 3, 2009 || Sandlot || G. Hug || V || align=right data-sort-value="0.70" | 700 m || 
|-id=039 bgcolor=#fefefe
| 362039 ||  || — || November 7, 2008 || Mount Lemmon || Mount Lemmon Survey || — || align=right data-sort-value="0.97" | 970 m || 
|-id=040 bgcolor=#fefefe
| 362040 ||  || — || January 2, 2009 || Kitt Peak || Spacewatch || FLO || align=right data-sort-value="0.68" | 680 m || 
|-id=041 bgcolor=#fefefe
| 362041 ||  || — || January 15, 2009 || Kitt Peak || Spacewatch || — || align=right data-sort-value="0.82" | 820 m || 
|-id=042 bgcolor=#fefefe
| 362042 ||  || — || January 18, 2009 || Socorro || LINEAR || — || align=right data-sort-value="0.82" | 820 m || 
|-id=043 bgcolor=#fefefe
| 362043 ||  || — || January 18, 2009 || Socorro || LINEAR || — || align=right data-sort-value="0.92" | 920 m || 
|-id=044 bgcolor=#fefefe
| 362044 ||  || — || December 22, 1998 || Kitt Peak || Spacewatch || — || align=right data-sort-value="0.97" | 970 m || 
|-id=045 bgcolor=#fefefe
| 362045 ||  || — || January 17, 2009 || Socorro || LINEAR || — || align=right data-sort-value="0.80" | 800 m || 
|-id=046 bgcolor=#fefefe
| 362046 ||  || — || January 18, 2009 || Socorro || LINEAR || PHO || align=right | 1.2 km || 
|-id=047 bgcolor=#FA8072
| 362047 ||  || — || January 17, 2009 || Mount Lemmon || Mount Lemmon Survey || — || align=right | 1.3 km || 
|-id=048 bgcolor=#fefefe
| 362048 ||  || — || January 16, 2009 || Kitt Peak || Spacewatch || NYS || align=right data-sort-value="0.73" | 730 m || 
|-id=049 bgcolor=#fefefe
| 362049 ||  || — || January 16, 2009 || Kitt Peak || Spacewatch || — || align=right data-sort-value="0.93" | 930 m || 
|-id=050 bgcolor=#fefefe
| 362050 ||  || — || January 16, 2009 || Kitt Peak || Spacewatch || MAS || align=right data-sort-value="0.63" | 630 m || 
|-id=051 bgcolor=#fefefe
| 362051 ||  || — || January 16, 2009 || Kitt Peak || Spacewatch || — || align=right data-sort-value="0.81" | 810 m || 
|-id=052 bgcolor=#fefefe
| 362052 ||  || — || January 16, 2009 || Kitt Peak || Spacewatch || MAS || align=right data-sort-value="0.66" | 660 m || 
|-id=053 bgcolor=#fefefe
| 362053 ||  || — || January 16, 2009 || Kitt Peak || Spacewatch || — || align=right data-sort-value="0.76" | 760 m || 
|-id=054 bgcolor=#fefefe
| 362054 ||  || — || January 16, 2009 || Kitt Peak || Spacewatch || FLO || align=right data-sort-value="0.62" | 620 m || 
|-id=055 bgcolor=#fefefe
| 362055 ||  || — || January 16, 2009 || Kitt Peak || Spacewatch || — || align=right data-sort-value="0.81" | 810 m || 
|-id=056 bgcolor=#fefefe
| 362056 ||  || — || January 16, 2009 || Kitt Peak || Spacewatch || NYS || align=right data-sort-value="0.62" | 620 m || 
|-id=057 bgcolor=#fefefe
| 362057 ||  || — || November 23, 2008 || Mount Lemmon || Mount Lemmon Survey || — || align=right data-sort-value="0.94" | 940 m || 
|-id=058 bgcolor=#fefefe
| 362058 ||  || — || January 16, 2009 || Kitt Peak || Spacewatch || V || align=right data-sort-value="0.81" | 810 m || 
|-id=059 bgcolor=#fefefe
| 362059 ||  || — || January 16, 2009 || Mount Lemmon || Mount Lemmon Survey || — || align=right data-sort-value="0.77" | 770 m || 
|-id=060 bgcolor=#fefefe
| 362060 ||  || — || January 16, 2009 || Mount Lemmon || Mount Lemmon Survey || MAS || align=right data-sort-value="0.77" | 770 m || 
|-id=061 bgcolor=#fefefe
| 362061 ||  || — || January 16, 2009 || Mount Lemmon || Mount Lemmon Survey || MAS || align=right data-sort-value="0.63" | 630 m || 
|-id=062 bgcolor=#fefefe
| 362062 ||  || — || December 30, 2008 || Mount Lemmon || Mount Lemmon Survey || MAS || align=right data-sort-value="0.68" | 680 m || 
|-id=063 bgcolor=#fefefe
| 362063 ||  || — || January 20, 2009 || Kitt Peak || Spacewatch || — || align=right | 1.1 km || 
|-id=064 bgcolor=#fefefe
| 362064 ||  || — || December 3, 2008 || Mount Lemmon || Mount Lemmon Survey || — || align=right data-sort-value="0.83" | 830 m || 
|-id=065 bgcolor=#fefefe
| 362065 ||  || — || January 19, 2009 || Mount Lemmon || Mount Lemmon Survey || ERI || align=right | 2.0 km || 
|-id=066 bgcolor=#fefefe
| 362066 ||  || — || January 20, 2009 || Kitt Peak || Spacewatch || — || align=right data-sort-value="0.80" | 800 m || 
|-id=067 bgcolor=#fefefe
| 362067 ||  || — || December 29, 2008 || Mount Lemmon || Mount Lemmon Survey || — || align=right data-sort-value="0.72" | 720 m || 
|-id=068 bgcolor=#fefefe
| 362068 ||  || — || December 30, 2008 || Mount Lemmon || Mount Lemmon Survey || — || align=right data-sort-value="0.94" | 940 m || 
|-id=069 bgcolor=#fefefe
| 362069 ||  || — || January 22, 2009 || Dauban || F. Kugel || NYS || align=right data-sort-value="0.77" | 770 m || 
|-id=070 bgcolor=#fefefe
| 362070 ||  || — || January 29, 2009 || Dauban || F. Kugel || — || align=right data-sort-value="0.96" | 960 m || 
|-id=071 bgcolor=#fefefe
| 362071 ||  || — || January 25, 2009 || Bergisch Gladbach || W. Bickel || — || align=right | 1.2 km || 
|-id=072 bgcolor=#fefefe
| 362072 ||  || — || January 31, 2009 || Kachina || J. Hobart || — || align=right data-sort-value="0.92" | 920 m || 
|-id=073 bgcolor=#fefefe
| 362073 ||  || — || January 25, 2009 || Kitt Peak || Spacewatch || MAS || align=right data-sort-value="0.70" | 700 m || 
|-id=074 bgcolor=#fefefe
| 362074 ||  || — || January 25, 2009 || Kitt Peak || Spacewatch || MAS || align=right data-sort-value="0.73" | 730 m || 
|-id=075 bgcolor=#fefefe
| 362075 ||  || — || January 15, 2009 || Kitt Peak || Spacewatch || NYS || align=right data-sort-value="0.59" | 590 m || 
|-id=076 bgcolor=#fefefe
| 362076 ||  || — || January 25, 2009 || Kitt Peak || Spacewatch || — || align=right data-sort-value="0.82" | 820 m || 
|-id=077 bgcolor=#fefefe
| 362077 ||  || — || January 25, 2009 || Kitt Peak || Spacewatch || — || align=right data-sort-value="0.88" | 880 m || 
|-id=078 bgcolor=#fefefe
| 362078 ||  || — || January 25, 2009 || Kitt Peak || Spacewatch || — || align=right data-sort-value="0.77" | 770 m || 
|-id=079 bgcolor=#fefefe
| 362079 ||  || — || January 26, 2009 || Purple Mountain || PMO NEO || ERI || align=right | 1.8 km || 
|-id=080 bgcolor=#fefefe
| 362080 ||  || — || January 31, 2009 || Kitt Peak || Spacewatch || — || align=right data-sort-value="0.69" | 690 m || 
|-id=081 bgcolor=#fefefe
| 362081 ||  || — || January 31, 2009 || Kitt Peak || Spacewatch || MAS || align=right data-sort-value="0.55" | 550 m || 
|-id=082 bgcolor=#fefefe
| 362082 ||  || — || January 26, 2009 || Purple Mountain || PMO NEO || — || align=right | 1.1 km || 
|-id=083 bgcolor=#fefefe
| 362083 ||  || — || January 15, 2009 || Kitt Peak || Spacewatch || MAS || align=right data-sort-value="0.63" | 630 m || 
|-id=084 bgcolor=#fefefe
| 362084 ||  || — || January 29, 2009 || Mount Lemmon || Mount Lemmon Survey || — || align=right data-sort-value="0.93" | 930 m || 
|-id=085 bgcolor=#fefefe
| 362085 ||  || — || January 29, 2009 || Mount Lemmon || Mount Lemmon Survey || — || align=right | 1.0 km || 
|-id=086 bgcolor=#fefefe
| 362086 ||  || — || January 31, 2009 || Mount Lemmon || Mount Lemmon Survey || NYS || align=right data-sort-value="0.72" | 720 m || 
|-id=087 bgcolor=#fefefe
| 362087 ||  || — || January 29, 2009 || Kitt Peak || Spacewatch || MAS || align=right data-sort-value="0.74" | 740 m || 
|-id=088 bgcolor=#fefefe
| 362088 ||  || — || January 20, 2009 || Kitt Peak || Spacewatch || MAS || align=right data-sort-value="0.68" | 680 m || 
|-id=089 bgcolor=#fefefe
| 362089 ||  || — || January 30, 2009 || Mount Lemmon || Mount Lemmon Survey || — || align=right data-sort-value="0.80" | 800 m || 
|-id=090 bgcolor=#fefefe
| 362090 ||  || — || January 31, 2009 || Kitt Peak || Spacewatch || MAS || align=right data-sort-value="0.66" | 660 m || 
|-id=091 bgcolor=#E9E9E9
| 362091 ||  || — || January 31, 2009 || Kitt Peak || Spacewatch || — || align=right | 1.3 km || 
|-id=092 bgcolor=#fefefe
| 362092 ||  || — || January 18, 2009 || Catalina || CSS || — || align=right | 1.0 km || 
|-id=093 bgcolor=#fefefe
| 362093 ||  || — || January 21, 2009 || Mount Lemmon || Mount Lemmon Survey || MAS || align=right data-sort-value="0.78" | 780 m || 
|-id=094 bgcolor=#fefefe
| 362094 ||  || — || January 31, 2009 || Mount Lemmon || Mount Lemmon Survey || — || align=right data-sort-value="0.77" | 770 m || 
|-id=095 bgcolor=#fefefe
| 362095 ||  || — || January 17, 2009 || Mount Lemmon || Mount Lemmon Survey || NYS || align=right data-sort-value="0.57" | 570 m || 
|-id=096 bgcolor=#fefefe
| 362096 ||  || — || January 16, 2009 || Kitt Peak || Spacewatch || V || align=right data-sort-value="0.71" | 710 m || 
|-id=097 bgcolor=#fefefe
| 362097 ||  || — || May 8, 2006 || Mount Lemmon || Mount Lemmon Survey || — || align=right | 1.1 km || 
|-id=098 bgcolor=#fefefe
| 362098 ||  || — || January 21, 2009 || Bergisch Gladbac || W. Bickel || ERI || align=right | 1.7 km || 
|-id=099 bgcolor=#fefefe
| 362099 ||  || — || January 17, 2009 || Mount Lemmon || Mount Lemmon Survey || — || align=right data-sort-value="0.89" | 890 m || 
|-id=100 bgcolor=#fefefe
| 362100 ||  || — || January 25, 2009 || Kitt Peak || Spacewatch || — || align=right data-sort-value="0.82" | 820 m || 
|}

362101–362200 

|-bgcolor=#fefefe
| 362101 ||  || — || February 2, 2009 || Sierra Stars || W. G. Dillon, D. Wells || MAS || align=right data-sort-value="0.76" | 760 m || 
|-id=102 bgcolor=#fefefe
| 362102 ||  || — || February 1, 2009 || Kitt Peak || Spacewatch || FLO || align=right data-sort-value="0.76" | 760 m || 
|-id=103 bgcolor=#fefefe
| 362103 ||  || — || February 1, 2009 || Kitt Peak || Spacewatch || — || align=right data-sort-value="0.79" | 790 m || 
|-id=104 bgcolor=#fefefe
| 362104 ||  || — || February 1, 2009 || Kitt Peak || Spacewatch || V || align=right data-sort-value="0.63" | 630 m || 
|-id=105 bgcolor=#fefefe
| 362105 ||  || — || February 1, 2009 || Kitt Peak || Spacewatch || NYS || align=right data-sort-value="0.58" | 580 m || 
|-id=106 bgcolor=#fefefe
| 362106 ||  || — || February 1, 2009 || Kitt Peak || Spacewatch || — || align=right data-sort-value="0.71" | 710 m || 
|-id=107 bgcolor=#fefefe
| 362107 ||  || — || February 1, 2009 || Kitt Peak || Spacewatch || FLO || align=right data-sort-value="0.79" | 790 m || 
|-id=108 bgcolor=#fefefe
| 362108 ||  || — || February 1, 2009 || Kitt Peak || Spacewatch || V || align=right data-sort-value="0.73" | 730 m || 
|-id=109 bgcolor=#fefefe
| 362109 ||  || — || January 17, 2005 || Kitt Peak || Spacewatch || — || align=right data-sort-value="0.78" | 780 m || 
|-id=110 bgcolor=#fefefe
| 362110 ||  || — || February 1, 2009 || Kitt Peak || Spacewatch || — || align=right data-sort-value="0.77" | 770 m || 
|-id=111 bgcolor=#fefefe
| 362111 ||  || — || February 14, 2009 || Dauban || F. Kugel || V || align=right data-sort-value="0.80" | 800 m || 
|-id=112 bgcolor=#fefefe
| 362112 ||  || — || February 14, 2009 || Kitt Peak || Spacewatch || — || align=right | 1.2 km || 
|-id=113 bgcolor=#fefefe
| 362113 ||  || — || February 3, 2009 || Kitt Peak || Spacewatch || — || align=right data-sort-value="0.94" | 940 m || 
|-id=114 bgcolor=#fefefe
| 362114 ||  || — || February 5, 2009 || Catalina || CSS || NYS || align=right data-sort-value="0.83" | 830 m || 
|-id=115 bgcolor=#fefefe
| 362115 ||  || — || February 4, 2009 || Kitt Peak || Spacewatch || MAS || align=right data-sort-value="0.74" | 740 m || 
|-id=116 bgcolor=#E9E9E9
| 362116 ||  || — || February 4, 2009 || Mount Lemmon || Mount Lemmon Survey || — || align=right | 2.1 km || 
|-id=117 bgcolor=#fefefe
| 362117 ||  || — || February 1, 2009 || Mount Lemmon || Mount Lemmon Survey || — || align=right data-sort-value="0.90" | 900 m || 
|-id=118 bgcolor=#fefefe
| 362118 ||  || — || February 3, 2009 || Mount Lemmon || Mount Lemmon Survey || NYS || align=right data-sort-value="0.62" | 620 m || 
|-id=119 bgcolor=#fefefe
| 362119 ||  || — || October 15, 2004 || Kitt Peak || Spacewatch || NYS || align=right data-sort-value="0.60" | 600 m || 
|-id=120 bgcolor=#fefefe
| 362120 ||  || — || February 17, 2009 || Cordell-Lorenz || D. T. Durig || V || align=right data-sort-value="0.82" | 820 m || 
|-id=121 bgcolor=#fefefe
| 362121 ||  || — || February 17, 2009 || Kitt Peak || Spacewatch || — || align=right | 1.1 km || 
|-id=122 bgcolor=#fefefe
| 362122 ||  || — || February 18, 2009 || Taunus || S. Karge, R. Kling || MAS || align=right data-sort-value="0.67" | 670 m || 
|-id=123 bgcolor=#fefefe
| 362123 ||  || — || February 16, 2009 || Kitt Peak || Spacewatch || — || align=right data-sort-value="0.97" | 970 m || 
|-id=124 bgcolor=#E9E9E9
| 362124 ||  || — || February 16, 2009 || Kitt Peak || Spacewatch || — || align=right | 1.2 km || 
|-id=125 bgcolor=#fefefe
| 362125 ||  || — || February 16, 2009 || La Sagra || OAM Obs. || — || align=right data-sort-value="0.89" | 890 m || 
|-id=126 bgcolor=#fefefe
| 362126 ||  || — || February 19, 2009 || Kitt Peak || Spacewatch || — || align=right | 1.0 km || 
|-id=127 bgcolor=#fefefe
| 362127 ||  || — || February 21, 2009 || Mount Lemmon || Mount Lemmon Survey || MAS || align=right data-sort-value="0.78" | 780 m || 
|-id=128 bgcolor=#fefefe
| 362128 ||  || — || February 23, 2009 || Calar Alto || F. Hormuth || — || align=right data-sort-value="0.80" | 800 m || 
|-id=129 bgcolor=#fefefe
| 362129 ||  || — || February 20, 2009 || Kitt Peak || Spacewatch || MAS || align=right data-sort-value="0.86" | 860 m || 
|-id=130 bgcolor=#fefefe
| 362130 ||  || — || February 21, 2009 || Mount Lemmon || Mount Lemmon Survey || MAS || align=right data-sort-value="0.79" | 790 m || 
|-id=131 bgcolor=#fefefe
| 362131 ||  || — || February 20, 2009 || Calvin-Rehoboth || Calvin–Rehoboth Obs. || ERI || align=right | 1.4 km || 
|-id=132 bgcolor=#fefefe
| 362132 ||  || — || February 28, 2009 || Socorro || LINEAR || — || align=right data-sort-value="0.77" | 770 m || 
|-id=133 bgcolor=#fefefe
| 362133 ||  || — || February 22, 2009 || Kitt Peak || Spacewatch || — || align=right data-sort-value="0.94" | 940 m || 
|-id=134 bgcolor=#fefefe
| 362134 ||  || — || February 22, 2009 || Kitt Peak || Spacewatch || — || align=right | 1.2 km || 
|-id=135 bgcolor=#fefefe
| 362135 ||  || — || February 26, 2009 || Catalina || CSS || NYS || align=right data-sort-value="0.86" | 860 m || 
|-id=136 bgcolor=#fefefe
| 362136 ||  || — || February 21, 2009 || Kitt Peak || Spacewatch || — || align=right | 1.1 km || 
|-id=137 bgcolor=#fefefe
| 362137 ||  || — || February 24, 2009 || Kitt Peak || Spacewatch || NYS || align=right data-sort-value="0.79" | 790 m || 
|-id=138 bgcolor=#E9E9E9
| 362138 ||  || — || February 24, 2009 || Kitt Peak || Spacewatch || — || align=right | 1.4 km || 
|-id=139 bgcolor=#fefefe
| 362139 ||  || — || February 24, 2009 || Kitt Peak || Spacewatch || — || align=right data-sort-value="0.87" | 870 m || 
|-id=140 bgcolor=#fefefe
| 362140 ||  || — || February 26, 2009 || Kitt Peak || Spacewatch || — || align=right | 1.1 km || 
|-id=141 bgcolor=#fefefe
| 362141 ||  || — || February 27, 2009 || Kitt Peak || Spacewatch || — || align=right data-sort-value="0.59" | 590 m || 
|-id=142 bgcolor=#E9E9E9
| 362142 ||  || — || August 28, 2006 || Kitt Peak || Spacewatch || MAR || align=right | 1.2 km || 
|-id=143 bgcolor=#fefefe
| 362143 ||  || — || February 28, 2009 || Mount Lemmon || Mount Lemmon Survey || NYS || align=right data-sort-value="0.82" | 820 m || 
|-id=144 bgcolor=#fefefe
| 362144 ||  || — || February 26, 2009 || Kitt Peak || Spacewatch || — || align=right data-sort-value="0.96" | 960 m || 
|-id=145 bgcolor=#fefefe
| 362145 ||  || — || February 4, 2009 || Mount Lemmon || Mount Lemmon Survey || — || align=right data-sort-value="0.89" | 890 m || 
|-id=146 bgcolor=#fefefe
| 362146 ||  || — || February 26, 2009 || Kitt Peak || Spacewatch || NYS || align=right data-sort-value="0.71" | 710 m || 
|-id=147 bgcolor=#fefefe
| 362147 ||  || — || February 27, 2009 || Catalina || CSS || — || align=right | 1.2 km || 
|-id=148 bgcolor=#fefefe
| 362148 ||  || — || February 26, 2009 || Calar Alto || F. Hormuth || — || align=right | 1.2 km || 
|-id=149 bgcolor=#fefefe
| 362149 ||  || — || October 23, 2003 || Anderson Mesa || LONEOS || — || align=right | 1.3 km || 
|-id=150 bgcolor=#fefefe
| 362150 ||  || — || February 27, 2009 || Kitt Peak || Spacewatch || MAS || align=right data-sort-value="0.75" | 750 m || 
|-id=151 bgcolor=#fefefe
| 362151 ||  || — || February 27, 2009 || Kitt Peak || Spacewatch || V || align=right data-sort-value="0.64" | 640 m || 
|-id=152 bgcolor=#fefefe
| 362152 ||  || — || February 19, 2009 || Catalina || CSS || — || align=right data-sort-value="0.94" | 940 m || 
|-id=153 bgcolor=#E9E9E9
| 362153 ||  || — || February 19, 2009 || Kitt Peak || Spacewatch || — || align=right | 1.0 km || 
|-id=154 bgcolor=#fefefe
| 362154 ||  || — || February 20, 2009 || Kitt Peak || Spacewatch || NYS || align=right data-sort-value="0.93" | 930 m || 
|-id=155 bgcolor=#fefefe
| 362155 ||  || — || February 20, 2009 || Kitt Peak || Spacewatch || — || align=right | 1.4 km || 
|-id=156 bgcolor=#fefefe
| 362156 ||  || — || February 27, 2009 || Kitt Peak || Spacewatch || — || align=right | 1.1 km || 
|-id=157 bgcolor=#E9E9E9
| 362157 ||  || — || February 28, 2009 || Kitt Peak || Spacewatch || — || align=right | 1.1 km || 
|-id=158 bgcolor=#fefefe
| 362158 ||  || — || November 7, 2007 || Kitt Peak || Spacewatch || — || align=right data-sort-value="0.86" | 860 m || 
|-id=159 bgcolor=#E9E9E9
| 362159 ||  || — || February 28, 2009 || Kitt Peak || Spacewatch || JUN || align=right | 1.2 km || 
|-id=160 bgcolor=#fefefe
| 362160 ||  || — || April 12, 2002 || Palomar || NEAT || MAS || align=right data-sort-value="0.77" | 770 m || 
|-id=161 bgcolor=#fefefe
| 362161 ||  || — || February 21, 2009 || Socorro || LINEAR || — || align=right | 3.0 km || 
|-id=162 bgcolor=#fefefe
| 362162 ||  || — || March 2, 2009 || Catalina || CSS || — || align=right | 3.9 km || 
|-id=163 bgcolor=#fefefe
| 362163 ||  || — || January 13, 2005 || Kitt Peak || Spacewatch || MAS || align=right data-sort-value="0.77" | 770 m || 
|-id=164 bgcolor=#fefefe
| 362164 ||  || — || March 2, 2009 || Mount Lemmon || Mount Lemmon Survey || ERI || align=right | 1.5 km || 
|-id=165 bgcolor=#fefefe
| 362165 ||  || — || March 1, 2009 || Mount Lemmon || Mount Lemmon Survey || — || align=right | 1.0 km || 
|-id=166 bgcolor=#fefefe
| 362166 ||  || — || March 15, 2009 || Kitt Peak || Spacewatch || — || align=right data-sort-value="0.86" | 860 m || 
|-id=167 bgcolor=#E9E9E9
| 362167 ||  || — || March 3, 2009 || Kitt Peak || Spacewatch || — || align=right data-sort-value="0.85" | 850 m || 
|-id=168 bgcolor=#fefefe
| 362168 ||  || — || March 3, 2009 || Mount Lemmon || Mount Lemmon Survey || NYS || align=right data-sort-value="0.76" | 760 m || 
|-id=169 bgcolor=#fefefe
| 362169 ||  || — || March 18, 2009 || La Sagra || OAM Obs. || NYS || align=right data-sort-value="0.70" | 700 m || 
|-id=170 bgcolor=#fefefe
| 362170 ||  || — || February 2, 2005 || Kitt Peak || Spacewatch || NYS || align=right data-sort-value="0.59" | 590 m || 
|-id=171 bgcolor=#fefefe
| 362171 ||  || — || March 18, 2009 || Mount Lemmon || Mount Lemmon Survey || — || align=right data-sort-value="0.88" | 880 m || 
|-id=172 bgcolor=#fefefe
| 362172 ||  || — || March 16, 2009 || Kitt Peak || Spacewatch || — || align=right data-sort-value="0.77" | 770 m || 
|-id=173 bgcolor=#fefefe
| 362173 ||  || — || March 18, 2009 || Mount Lemmon || Mount Lemmon Survey || NYS || align=right data-sort-value="0.69" | 690 m || 
|-id=174 bgcolor=#E9E9E9
| 362174 ||  || — || March 19, 2009 || Kitt Peak || Spacewatch || — || align=right data-sort-value="0.97" | 970 m || 
|-id=175 bgcolor=#fefefe
| 362175 ||  || — || March 19, 2009 || Mount Lemmon || Mount Lemmon Survey || NYS || align=right data-sort-value="0.79" | 790 m || 
|-id=176 bgcolor=#fefefe
| 362176 ||  || — || March 22, 2009 || Vicques || M. Ory || — || align=right | 1.0 km || 
|-id=177 bgcolor=#fefefe
| 362177 Anji ||  ||  || March 21, 2009 || Lulin Observatory || T. Chen || MAS || align=right data-sort-value="0.74" | 740 m || 
|-id=178 bgcolor=#E9E9E9
| 362178 ||  || — || March 24, 2009 || Sierra Stars || W. G. Dillon, D. Wells || — || align=right data-sort-value="0.79" | 790 m || 
|-id=179 bgcolor=#fefefe
| 362179 ||  || — || March 24, 2009 || Mount Lemmon || Mount Lemmon Survey || — || align=right data-sort-value="0.90" | 900 m || 
|-id=180 bgcolor=#fefefe
| 362180 ||  || — || March 21, 2009 || Catalina || CSS || MAS || align=right data-sort-value="0.78" | 780 m || 
|-id=181 bgcolor=#fefefe
| 362181 ||  || — || March 28, 2009 || Mount Lemmon || Mount Lemmon Survey || — || align=right data-sort-value="0.97" | 970 m || 
|-id=182 bgcolor=#E9E9E9
| 362182 ||  || — || March 18, 2009 || Kitt Peak || Spacewatch || RAF || align=right data-sort-value="0.77" | 770 m || 
|-id=183 bgcolor=#fefefe
| 362183 ||  || — || March 23, 2009 || Purple Mountain || PMO NEO || — || align=right data-sort-value="0.88" | 880 m || 
|-id=184 bgcolor=#E9E9E9
| 362184 ||  || — || March 17, 2009 || Kitt Peak || Spacewatch || — || align=right | 2.6 km || 
|-id=185 bgcolor=#E9E9E9
| 362185 ||  || — || February 24, 2009 || Kitt Peak || Spacewatch || KON || align=right | 2.3 km || 
|-id=186 bgcolor=#fefefe
| 362186 ||  || — || March 19, 2009 || Calar Alto || F. Hormuth || — || align=right data-sort-value="0.90" | 900 m || 
|-id=187 bgcolor=#E9E9E9
| 362187 ||  || — || March 21, 2009 || Kitt Peak || Spacewatch || — || align=right | 1.3 km || 
|-id=188 bgcolor=#E9E9E9
| 362188 ||  || — || March 18, 2009 || Kitt Peak || Spacewatch || — || align=right | 1.2 km || 
|-id=189 bgcolor=#E9E9E9
| 362189 ||  || — || March 18, 2009 || Mount Lemmon || Mount Lemmon Survey || — || align=right | 1.8 km || 
|-id=190 bgcolor=#E9E9E9
| 362190 ||  || — || March 21, 2009 || Kitt Peak || Spacewatch || — || align=right | 1.5 km || 
|-id=191 bgcolor=#fefefe
| 362191 ||  || — || March 19, 2009 || Mount Lemmon || Mount Lemmon Survey || CLA || align=right | 1.7 km || 
|-id=192 bgcolor=#E9E9E9
| 362192 ||  || — || March 26, 2009 || Kitt Peak || Spacewatch || — || align=right | 1.4 km || 
|-id=193 bgcolor=#E9E9E9
| 362193 ||  || — || April 3, 2009 || Cerro Burek || Alianza S4 Obs. || MAR || align=right | 1.3 km || 
|-id=194 bgcolor=#fefefe
| 362194 ||  || — || April 17, 2009 || Kitt Peak || Spacewatch || — || align=right data-sort-value="0.88" | 880 m || 
|-id=195 bgcolor=#E9E9E9
| 362195 ||  || — || April 17, 2009 || Kitt Peak || Spacewatch || — || align=right | 1.3 km || 
|-id=196 bgcolor=#E9E9E9
| 362196 ||  || — || April 17, 2009 || Mount Lemmon || Mount Lemmon Survey || — || align=right | 2.8 km || 
|-id=197 bgcolor=#fefefe
| 362197 ||  || — || April 18, 2009 || Kitt Peak || Spacewatch || — || align=right data-sort-value="0.89" | 890 m || 
|-id=198 bgcolor=#fefefe
| 362198 ||  || — || April 18, 2009 || Catalina || CSS || — || align=right | 1.2 km || 
|-id=199 bgcolor=#E9E9E9
| 362199 ||  || — || April 19, 2009 || Kitt Peak || Spacewatch || — || align=right | 2.5 km || 
|-id=200 bgcolor=#E9E9E9
| 362200 ||  || — || April 16, 2009 || Catalina || CSS || — || align=right | 1.8 km || 
|}

362201–362300 

|-bgcolor=#E9E9E9
| 362201 ||  || — || April 18, 2009 || Kitt Peak || Spacewatch || RAF || align=right data-sort-value="0.93" | 930 m || 
|-id=202 bgcolor=#E9E9E9
| 362202 ||  || — || April 18, 2009 || Mount Lemmon || Mount Lemmon Survey || — || align=right | 1.0 km || 
|-id=203 bgcolor=#E9E9E9
| 362203 ||  || — || November 17, 2007 || Catalina || CSS || — || align=right | 1.2 km || 
|-id=204 bgcolor=#E9E9E9
| 362204 ||  || — || January 30, 2008 || Mount Lemmon || Mount Lemmon Survey || WIT || align=right | 1.2 km || 
|-id=205 bgcolor=#E9E9E9
| 362205 ||  || — || April 19, 2009 || Mount Lemmon || Mount Lemmon Survey || — || align=right | 1.5 km || 
|-id=206 bgcolor=#E9E9E9
| 362206 ||  || — || April 20, 2009 || Kitt Peak || Spacewatch || — || align=right data-sort-value="0.81" | 810 m || 
|-id=207 bgcolor=#E9E9E9
| 362207 ||  || — || April 20, 2009 || Kitt Peak || Spacewatch || — || align=right | 1.0 km || 
|-id=208 bgcolor=#E9E9E9
| 362208 ||  || — || April 21, 2009 || Kitt Peak || Spacewatch || — || align=right | 2.8 km || 
|-id=209 bgcolor=#E9E9E9
| 362209 ||  || — || April 19, 2009 || Kitt Peak || Spacewatch || — || align=right | 1.3 km || 
|-id=210 bgcolor=#E9E9E9
| 362210 ||  || — || April 19, 2009 || Catalina || CSS || — || align=right | 1.2 km || 
|-id=211 bgcolor=#E9E9E9
| 362211 ||  || — || April 21, 2009 || Kitt Peak || Spacewatch || EUN || align=right | 1.4 km || 
|-id=212 bgcolor=#E9E9E9
| 362212 ||  || — || April 21, 2009 || Socorro || LINEAR || — || align=right | 1.2 km || 
|-id=213 bgcolor=#E9E9E9
| 362213 ||  || — || April 21, 2009 || Kitt Peak || Spacewatch || — || align=right | 2.6 km || 
|-id=214 bgcolor=#E9E9E9
| 362214 ||  || — || April 23, 2009 || Kitt Peak || Spacewatch || — || align=right | 1.1 km || 
|-id=215 bgcolor=#E9E9E9
| 362215 ||  || — || April 23, 2009 || Kitt Peak || Spacewatch || JUN || align=right | 1.3 km || 
|-id=216 bgcolor=#E9E9E9
| 362216 ||  || — || April 23, 2009 || Kitt Peak || Spacewatch || — || align=right | 2.2 km || 
|-id=217 bgcolor=#E9E9E9
| 362217 ||  || — || April 18, 2009 || Kitt Peak || Spacewatch || — || align=right | 1.1 km || 
|-id=218 bgcolor=#E9E9E9
| 362218 ||  || — || March 21, 2009 || Catalina || CSS || — || align=right | 1.4 km || 
|-id=219 bgcolor=#E9E9E9
| 362219 ||  || — || April 28, 2009 || Catalina || CSS || — || align=right | 1.3 km || 
|-id=220 bgcolor=#E9E9E9
| 362220 ||  || — || April 26, 2009 || Kitt Peak || Spacewatch || — || align=right | 1.2 km || 
|-id=221 bgcolor=#fefefe
| 362221 ||  || — || April 26, 2009 || Kitt Peak || Spacewatch || LCI || align=right | 1.4 km || 
|-id=222 bgcolor=#E9E9E9
| 362222 ||  || — || April 26, 2009 || Kitt Peak || Spacewatch || — || align=right | 1.1 km || 
|-id=223 bgcolor=#E9E9E9
| 362223 ||  || — || April 29, 2009 || Mount Lemmon || Mount Lemmon Survey || RAF || align=right data-sort-value="0.78" | 780 m || 
|-id=224 bgcolor=#E9E9E9
| 362224 ||  || — || April 23, 2009 || La Sagra || OAM Obs. || JUN || align=right | 3.4 km || 
|-id=225 bgcolor=#E9E9E9
| 362225 ||  || — || April 19, 2009 || Mount Lemmon || Mount Lemmon Survey || — || align=right | 1.5 km || 
|-id=226 bgcolor=#E9E9E9
| 362226 ||  || — || April 30, 2009 || Kitt Peak || Spacewatch || EUN || align=right | 1.5 km || 
|-id=227 bgcolor=#E9E9E9
| 362227 ||  || — || April 30, 2009 || Kitt Peak || Spacewatch || — || align=right | 1.7 km || 
|-id=228 bgcolor=#E9E9E9
| 362228 ||  || — || April 18, 2009 || Kitt Peak || Spacewatch || — || align=right | 1.9 km || 
|-id=229 bgcolor=#E9E9E9
| 362229 ||  || — || April 18, 2009 || Kitt Peak || Spacewatch || — || align=right | 1.5 km || 
|-id=230 bgcolor=#E9E9E9
| 362230 ||  || — || April 19, 2009 || Kitt Peak || Spacewatch || — || align=right | 1.9 km || 
|-id=231 bgcolor=#E9E9E9
| 362231 ||  || — || April 24, 2009 || Kitt Peak || Spacewatch || — || align=right | 2.2 km || 
|-id=232 bgcolor=#E9E9E9
| 362232 ||  || — || May 2, 2009 || La Sagra || OAM Obs. || — || align=right | 2.0 km || 
|-id=233 bgcolor=#E9E9E9
| 362233 ||  || — || May 1, 2009 || Kitt Peak || Spacewatch || — || align=right | 2.0 km || 
|-id=234 bgcolor=#E9E9E9
| 362234 ||  || — || May 14, 2009 || Kitt Peak || Spacewatch || — || align=right | 1.9 km || 
|-id=235 bgcolor=#E9E9E9
| 362235 ||  || — || May 13, 2009 || Kitt Peak || Spacewatch || — || align=right | 1.5 km || 
|-id=236 bgcolor=#E9E9E9
| 362236 ||  || — || May 16, 2009 || La Sagra || OAM Obs. || EUN || align=right | 1.6 km || 
|-id=237 bgcolor=#E9E9E9
| 362237 ||  || — || April 30, 2009 || Kitt Peak || Spacewatch || — || align=right | 1.3 km || 
|-id=238 bgcolor=#E9E9E9
| 362238 Shisseh ||  ||  || May 19, 2009 || Vicques || M. Ory || EUN || align=right | 1.5 km || 
|-id=239 bgcolor=#E9E9E9
| 362239 ||  || — || April 21, 2009 || Kitt Peak || Spacewatch || EUN || align=right | 1.5 km || 
|-id=240 bgcolor=#E9E9E9
| 362240 ||  || — || May 25, 2009 || Mount Lemmon || Mount Lemmon Survey || — || align=right | 1.6 km || 
|-id=241 bgcolor=#E9E9E9
| 362241 ||  || — || May 19, 2009 || Tzec Maun || F. Tozzi || — || align=right | 1.2 km || 
|-id=242 bgcolor=#E9E9E9
| 362242 ||  || — || May 28, 2009 || Pla D'Arguines || R. Ferrando || — || align=right | 2.0 km || 
|-id=243 bgcolor=#E9E9E9
| 362243 ||  || — || May 19, 2005 || Mount Lemmon || Mount Lemmon Survey || — || align=right data-sort-value="0.98" | 980 m || 
|-id=244 bgcolor=#E9E9E9
| 362244 ||  || — || April 20, 2009 || Kitt Peak || Spacewatch || EUN || align=right | 1.3 km || 
|-id=245 bgcolor=#E9E9E9
| 362245 ||  || — || May 26, 2009 || Catalina || CSS || — || align=right | 1.5 km || 
|-id=246 bgcolor=#E9E9E9
| 362246 ||  || — || May 26, 2009 || Kitt Peak || Spacewatch || — || align=right data-sort-value="0.96" | 960 m || 
|-id=247 bgcolor=#E9E9E9
| 362247 ||  || — || April 19, 2009 || Kitt Peak || Spacewatch || — || align=right | 1.4 km || 
|-id=248 bgcolor=#E9E9E9
| 362248 ||  || — || May 27, 2009 || Kitt Peak || Spacewatch || — || align=right | 1.0 km || 
|-id=249 bgcolor=#E9E9E9
| 362249 ||  || — || May 27, 2009 || Kitt Peak || Spacewatch || HNS || align=right | 1.2 km || 
|-id=250 bgcolor=#E9E9E9
| 362250 ||  || — || May 27, 2009 || Kitt Peak || Spacewatch || ADE || align=right | 2.2 km || 
|-id=251 bgcolor=#E9E9E9
| 362251 ||  || — || May 29, 2009 || Mount Lemmon || Mount Lemmon Survey || — || align=right | 2.9 km || 
|-id=252 bgcolor=#E9E9E9
| 362252 ||  || — || June 11, 2009 || La Sagra || OAM Obs. || — || align=right | 3.2 km || 
|-id=253 bgcolor=#E9E9E9
| 362253 ||  || — || June 11, 2009 || La Sagra || OAM Obs. || — || align=right | 1.5 km || 
|-id=254 bgcolor=#E9E9E9
| 362254 ||  || — || June 15, 2009 || Kitt Peak || Spacewatch || — || align=right | 2.6 km || 
|-id=255 bgcolor=#E9E9E9
| 362255 ||  || — || June 15, 2009 || Mount Lemmon || Mount Lemmon Survey || JUN || align=right | 1.4 km || 
|-id=256 bgcolor=#E9E9E9
| 362256 ||  || — || May 2, 2009 || Siding Spring || SSS || — || align=right | 1.8 km || 
|-id=257 bgcolor=#d6d6d6
| 362257 ||  || — || June 24, 2009 || Mount Lemmon || Mount Lemmon Survey || EMA || align=right | 3.5 km || 
|-id=258 bgcolor=#E9E9E9
| 362258 ||  || — || July 15, 2009 || La Sagra || OAM Obs. || — || align=right | 1.5 km || 
|-id=259 bgcolor=#d6d6d6
| 362259 ||  || — || July 14, 2009 || Cerro Burek || Alianza S4 Obs. || EOS || align=right | 2.3 km || 
|-id=260 bgcolor=#E9E9E9
| 362260 ||  || — || July 19, 2009 || La Sagra || OAM Obs. || — || align=right | 1.8 km || 
|-id=261 bgcolor=#d6d6d6
| 362261 ||  || — || May 14, 2008 || Mount Lemmon || Mount Lemmon Survey || — || align=right | 3.6 km || 
|-id=262 bgcolor=#E9E9E9
| 362262 ||  || — || July 25, 2009 || Marly || P. Kocher || — || align=right | 2.3 km || 
|-id=263 bgcolor=#d6d6d6
| 362263 ||  || — || July 29, 1998 || Caussols || ODAS || — || align=right | 3.5 km || 
|-id=264 bgcolor=#d6d6d6
| 362264 ||  || — || April 1, 2008 || Kitt Peak || Spacewatch || EOS || align=right | 1.8 km || 
|-id=265 bgcolor=#d6d6d6
| 362265 ||  || — || August 15, 2009 || Catalina || CSS || — || align=right | 4.7 km || 
|-id=266 bgcolor=#d6d6d6
| 362266 ||  || — || August 15, 2009 || Črni Vrh || Črni Vrh || — || align=right | 4.6 km || 
|-id=267 bgcolor=#d6d6d6
| 362267 ||  || — || August 15, 2009 || Črni Vrh || Črni Vrh || EOS || align=right | 2.5 km || 
|-id=268 bgcolor=#d6d6d6
| 362268 ||  || — || August 15, 2009 || Kitt Peak || Spacewatch || — || align=right | 3.6 km || 
|-id=269 bgcolor=#d6d6d6
| 362269 ||  || — || August 15, 2009 || Kitt Peak || Spacewatch || HYG || align=right | 3.0 km || 
|-id=270 bgcolor=#d6d6d6
| 362270 ||  || — || August 15, 2009 || Kitt Peak || Spacewatch || VER || align=right | 2.9 km || 
|-id=271 bgcolor=#d6d6d6
| 362271 ||  || — || August 15, 2009 || Kitt Peak || Spacewatch || — || align=right | 3.5 km || 
|-id=272 bgcolor=#d6d6d6
| 362272 ||  || — || August 16, 2009 || La Sagra || OAM Obs. || — || align=right | 2.4 km || 
|-id=273 bgcolor=#d6d6d6
| 362273 ||  || — || August 16, 2009 || Kitt Peak || Spacewatch || HYG || align=right | 3.4 km || 
|-id=274 bgcolor=#d6d6d6
| 362274 ||  || — || August 16, 2009 || Kitt Peak || Spacewatch || — || align=right | 3.5 km || 
|-id=275 bgcolor=#d6d6d6
| 362275 ||  || — || August 28, 2009 || Plana || F. Fratev || — || align=right | 3.4 km || 
|-id=276 bgcolor=#d6d6d6
| 362276 ||  || — || August 20, 2009 || Kitt Peak || Spacewatch || — || align=right | 2.8 km || 
|-id=277 bgcolor=#d6d6d6
| 362277 ||  || — || March 12, 2007 || Kitt Peak || Spacewatch || — || align=right | 3.8 km || 
|-id=278 bgcolor=#d6d6d6
| 362278 ||  || — || August 20, 2009 || Catalina || CSS || — || align=right | 4.3 km || 
|-id=279 bgcolor=#d6d6d6
| 362279 ||  || — || September 12, 2009 || Kitt Peak || Spacewatch || VER || align=right | 3.4 km || 
|-id=280 bgcolor=#d6d6d6
| 362280 ||  || — || September 12, 2009 || Kitt Peak || Spacewatch || TIR || align=right | 3.0 km || 
|-id=281 bgcolor=#d6d6d6
| 362281 ||  || — || October 4, 2004 || Kitt Peak || Spacewatch || — || align=right | 3.6 km || 
|-id=282 bgcolor=#d6d6d6
| 362282 ||  || — || September 13, 2009 || Socorro || LINEAR || — || align=right | 3.5 km || 
|-id=283 bgcolor=#d6d6d6
| 362283 ||  || — || September 12, 2009 || Kitt Peak || Spacewatch || — || align=right | 4.2 km || 
|-id=284 bgcolor=#d6d6d6
| 362284 ||  || — || September 16, 2009 || Mount Lemmon || Mount Lemmon Survey || — || align=right | 2.6 km || 
|-id=285 bgcolor=#d6d6d6
| 362285 ||  || — || September 16, 2009 || Catalina || CSS || — || align=right | 4.7 km || 
|-id=286 bgcolor=#d6d6d6
| 362286 ||  || — || September 16, 2009 || Mount Lemmon || Mount Lemmon Survey || TIR || align=right | 2.9 km || 
|-id=287 bgcolor=#d6d6d6
| 362287 ||  || — || February 17, 2007 || Mount Lemmon || Mount Lemmon Survey || — || align=right | 4.1 km || 
|-id=288 bgcolor=#d6d6d6
| 362288 ||  || — || September 14, 2002 || Palomar || NEAT || 7:4 || align=right | 4.4 km || 
|-id=289 bgcolor=#d6d6d6
| 362289 ||  || — || September 18, 2009 || Kitt Peak || Spacewatch || EOS || align=right | 2.2 km || 
|-id=290 bgcolor=#d6d6d6
| 362290 ||  || — || September 20, 2009 || Mount Lemmon || Mount Lemmon Survey || HYG || align=right | 2.8 km || 
|-id=291 bgcolor=#d6d6d6
| 362291 ||  || — || August 18, 2009 || Kitt Peak || Spacewatch || 7:4 || align=right | 3.4 km || 
|-id=292 bgcolor=#d6d6d6
| 362292 ||  || — || September 16, 2009 || Kitt Peak || Spacewatch || — || align=right | 3.4 km || 
|-id=293 bgcolor=#d6d6d6
| 362293 ||  || — || September 16, 2009 || Catalina || CSS || LUT || align=right | 6.1 km || 
|-id=294 bgcolor=#d6d6d6
| 362294 ||  || — || December 25, 2005 || Kitt Peak || Spacewatch || — || align=right | 3.4 km || 
|-id=295 bgcolor=#d6d6d6
| 362295 ||  || — || September 18, 2009 || Kitt Peak || Spacewatch || — || align=right | 4.5 km || 
|-id=296 bgcolor=#d6d6d6
| 362296 ||  || — || December 1, 2005 || Kitt Peak || Spacewatch || — || align=right | 3.5 km || 
|-id=297 bgcolor=#d6d6d6
| 362297 ||  || — || September 23, 2009 || Mount Lemmon || Mount Lemmon Survey || — || align=right | 4.4 km || 
|-id=298 bgcolor=#d6d6d6
| 362298 ||  || — || September 25, 2009 || Kitt Peak || Spacewatch || — || align=right | 2.9 km || 
|-id=299 bgcolor=#d6d6d6
| 362299 ||  || — || September 25, 2009 || Kitt Peak || Spacewatch || — || align=right | 3.1 km || 
|-id=300 bgcolor=#d6d6d6
| 362300 ||  || — || September 25, 2009 || Kitt Peak || Spacewatch || — || align=right | 3.7 km || 
|}

362301–362400 

|-bgcolor=#d6d6d6
| 362301 ||  || — || August 16, 2009 || Kitt Peak || Spacewatch || — || align=right | 3.6 km || 
|-id=302 bgcolor=#d6d6d6
| 362302 ||  || — || September 17, 2009 || Kitt Peak || Spacewatch || — || align=right | 2.4 km || 
|-id=303 bgcolor=#d6d6d6
| 362303 ||  || — || September 18, 2009 || Mount Lemmon || Mount Lemmon Survey || — || align=right | 2.5 km || 
|-id=304 bgcolor=#d6d6d6
| 362304 ||  || — || September 26, 2009 || Kitt Peak || Spacewatch || — || align=right | 2.9 km || 
|-id=305 bgcolor=#d6d6d6
| 362305 ||  || — || September 22, 2009 || Mount Lemmon || Mount Lemmon Survey || — || align=right | 2.5 km || 
|-id=306 bgcolor=#d6d6d6
| 362306 ||  || — || October 13, 2009 || Mayhill || A. Lowe || MEL || align=right | 5.2 km || 
|-id=307 bgcolor=#d6d6d6
| 362307 ||  || — || October 12, 2009 || Mount Lemmon || Mount Lemmon Survey || THM || align=right | 3.0 km || 
|-id=308 bgcolor=#d6d6d6
| 362308 ||  || — || October 15, 2009 || La Sagra || OAM Obs. || EUP || align=right | 5.4 km || 
|-id=309 bgcolor=#d6d6d6
| 362309 ||  || — || October 13, 2009 || Socorro || LINEAR || — || align=right | 4.0 km || 
|-id=310 bgcolor=#FFC2E0
| 362310 ||  || — || October 19, 2009 || Socorro || LINEAR || APO +1kmcritical || align=right data-sort-value="0.89" | 890 m || 
|-id=311 bgcolor=#fefefe
| 362311 ||  || — || October 22, 2009 || Catalina || CSS || H || align=right data-sort-value="0.84" | 840 m || 
|-id=312 bgcolor=#d6d6d6
| 362312 ||  || — || October 24, 2009 || Mount Lemmon || Mount Lemmon Survey || — || align=right | 3.2 km || 
|-id=313 bgcolor=#d6d6d6
| 362313 ||  || — || October 22, 2009 || Mount Lemmon || Mount Lemmon Survey || — || align=right | 3.1 km || 
|-id=314 bgcolor=#C2FFFF
| 362314 ||  || — || October 2, 2008 || Kitt Peak || Spacewatch || L4 || align=right | 6.3 km || 
|-id=315 bgcolor=#d6d6d6
| 362315 ||  || — || October 24, 2009 || Kitt Peak || Spacewatch || 3:2 || align=right | 6.2 km || 
|-id=316 bgcolor=#d6d6d6
| 362316 Dogora ||  ||  || November 15, 2009 || Nogales || J.-C. Merlin || — || align=right | 3.1 km || 
|-id=317 bgcolor=#d6d6d6
| 362317 ||  || — || November 8, 2009 || Kitt Peak || Spacewatch || — || align=right | 3.2 km || 
|-id=318 bgcolor=#d6d6d6
| 362318 ||  || — || September 17, 2009 || Mount Lemmon || Mount Lemmon Survey || — || align=right | 4.4 km || 
|-id=319 bgcolor=#fefefe
| 362319 ||  || — || January 10, 2010 || Socorro || LINEAR || H || align=right data-sort-value="0.78" | 780 m || 
|-id=320 bgcolor=#fefefe
| 362320 ||  || — || January 6, 2010 || Catalina || CSS || H || align=right data-sort-value="0.98" | 980 m || 
|-id=321 bgcolor=#C2FFFF
| 362321 ||  || — || May 14, 2004 || Kitt Peak || Spacewatch || L4 || align=right | 13 km || 
|-id=322 bgcolor=#fefefe
| 362322 ||  || — || March 9, 2005 || Catalina || CSS || H || align=right data-sort-value="0.85" | 850 m || 
|-id=323 bgcolor=#fefefe
| 362323 ||  || — || March 19, 2010 || Kitt Peak || Spacewatch || — || align=right | 1.1 km || 
|-id=324 bgcolor=#fefefe
| 362324 ||  || — || April 8, 2010 || Kitt Peak || Spacewatch || — || align=right data-sort-value="0.86" | 860 m || 
|-id=325 bgcolor=#fefefe
| 362325 ||  || — || April 19, 2010 || WISE || WISE || — || align=right | 1.3 km || 
|-id=326 bgcolor=#fefefe
| 362326 ||  || — || April 19, 2010 || WISE || WISE || — || align=right | 2.2 km || 
|-id=327 bgcolor=#fefefe
| 362327 ||  || — || April 20, 2010 || Kitt Peak || Spacewatch || — || align=right data-sort-value="0.72" | 720 m || 
|-id=328 bgcolor=#fefefe
| 362328 ||  || — || April 8, 2010 || Kitt Peak || Spacewatch || — || align=right data-sort-value="0.69" | 690 m || 
|-id=329 bgcolor=#fefefe
| 362329 ||  || — || November 21, 2008 || Kitt Peak || Spacewatch || — || align=right data-sort-value="0.56" | 560 m || 
|-id=330 bgcolor=#fefefe
| 362330 ||  || — || May 4, 2010 || Kitt Peak || Spacewatch || — || align=right data-sort-value="0.60" | 600 m || 
|-id=331 bgcolor=#fefefe
| 362331 ||  || — || May 4, 2010 || Catalina || CSS || — || align=right | 1.2 km || 
|-id=332 bgcolor=#fefefe
| 362332 ||  || — || May 19, 2010 || WISE || WISE || SVE || align=right | 2.7 km || 
|-id=333 bgcolor=#fefefe
| 362333 ||  || — || May 17, 2010 || Kitt Peak || Spacewatch || — || align=right data-sort-value="0.68" | 680 m || 
|-id=334 bgcolor=#E9E9E9
| 362334 ||  || — || May 22, 2010 || WISE || WISE || — || align=right | 2.1 km || 
|-id=335 bgcolor=#fefefe
| 362335 ||  || — || May 31, 2010 || WISE || WISE || — || align=right | 1.9 km || 
|-id=336 bgcolor=#E9E9E9
| 362336 ||  || — || June 3, 2010 || WISE || WISE || — || align=right | 3.0 km || 
|-id=337 bgcolor=#E9E9E9
| 362337 ||  || — || June 6, 2010 || WISE || WISE || HOF || align=right | 2.5 km || 
|-id=338 bgcolor=#d6d6d6
| 362338 ||  || — || October 10, 2005 || Catalina || CSS || — || align=right | 4.0 km || 
|-id=339 bgcolor=#E9E9E9
| 362339 ||  || — || June 8, 2010 || WISE || WISE || — || align=right | 3.1 km || 
|-id=340 bgcolor=#fefefe
| 362340 ||  || — || June 10, 2010 || Mount Lemmon || Mount Lemmon Survey || — || align=right data-sort-value="0.81" | 810 m || 
|-id=341 bgcolor=#E9E9E9
| 362341 ||  || — || October 3, 2006 || Mount Lemmon || Mount Lemmon Survey || PAD || align=right | 2.4 km || 
|-id=342 bgcolor=#E9E9E9
| 362342 ||  || — || June 11, 2010 || WISE || WISE || HOF || align=right | 2.6 km || 
|-id=343 bgcolor=#E9E9E9
| 362343 ||  || — || June 15, 2010 || Mount Lemmon || Mount Lemmon Survey || — || align=right | 3.2 km || 
|-id=344 bgcolor=#fefefe
| 362344 ||  || — || May 2, 2006 || Mount Lemmon || Mount Lemmon Survey || — || align=right | 2.0 km || 
|-id=345 bgcolor=#E9E9E9
| 362345 ||  || — || June 21, 2010 || WISE || WISE || — || align=right | 2.4 km || 
|-id=346 bgcolor=#E9E9E9
| 362346 ||  || — || October 28, 2006 || Mount Lemmon || Mount Lemmon Survey || — || align=right | 2.0 km || 
|-id=347 bgcolor=#E9E9E9
| 362347 ||  || — || June 23, 2010 || WISE || WISE || ADE || align=right | 2.4 km || 
|-id=348 bgcolor=#d6d6d6
| 362348 ||  || — || March 17, 2002 || Kitt Peak || Spacewatch || URS || align=right | 4.2 km || 
|-id=349 bgcolor=#E9E9E9
| 362349 ||  || — || June 25, 2010 || WISE || WISE || — || align=right | 2.1 km || 
|-id=350 bgcolor=#d6d6d6
| 362350 ||  || — || February 11, 2002 || Socorro || LINEAR || — || align=right | 4.4 km || 
|-id=351 bgcolor=#E9E9E9
| 362351 ||  || — || March 28, 2008 || Mount Lemmon || Mount Lemmon Survey || — || align=right | 2.7 km || 
|-id=352 bgcolor=#FA8072
| 362352 ||  || — || April 30, 2006 || Kitt Peak || Spacewatch || — || align=right data-sort-value="0.75" | 750 m || 
|-id=353 bgcolor=#E9E9E9
| 362353 ||  || — || June 27, 2010 || WISE || WISE || — || align=right | 2.3 km || 
|-id=354 bgcolor=#E9E9E9
| 362354 ||  || — || June 27, 2010 || WISE || WISE || HOF || align=right | 2.7 km || 
|-id=355 bgcolor=#E9E9E9
| 362355 ||  || — || June 28, 2010 || WISE || WISE || ADE || align=right | 3.1 km || 
|-id=356 bgcolor=#E9E9E9
| 362356 ||  || — || June 28, 2010 || WISE || WISE || — || align=right | 1.4 km || 
|-id=357 bgcolor=#fefefe
| 362357 ||  || — || May 10, 2002 || Palomar || NEAT || ERI || align=right | 1.7 km || 
|-id=358 bgcolor=#fefefe
| 362358 ||  || — || July 4, 2010 || Mount Lemmon || Mount Lemmon Survey || V || align=right data-sort-value="0.90" | 900 m || 
|-id=359 bgcolor=#fefefe
| 362359 ||  || — || July 4, 2010 || Kitt Peak || Spacewatch || V || align=right data-sort-value="0.71" | 710 m || 
|-id=360 bgcolor=#fefefe
| 362360 ||  || — || July 5, 2010 || Mount Lemmon || Mount Lemmon Survey || MAS || align=right data-sort-value="0.92" | 920 m || 
|-id=361 bgcolor=#fefefe
| 362361 ||  || — || July 5, 2010 || Kitt Peak || Spacewatch || NYS || align=right data-sort-value="0.72" | 720 m || 
|-id=362 bgcolor=#d6d6d6
| 362362 ||  || — || February 10, 2007 || Mount Lemmon || Mount Lemmon Survey || — || align=right | 4.2 km || 
|-id=363 bgcolor=#E9E9E9
| 362363 ||  || — || March 12, 2008 || Kitt Peak || Spacewatch || PAD || align=right | 2.7 km || 
|-id=364 bgcolor=#d6d6d6
| 362364 ||  || — || July 6, 2010 || WISE || WISE || — || align=right | 5.4 km || 
|-id=365 bgcolor=#d6d6d6
| 362365 ||  || — || April 11, 2008 || Mount Lemmon || Mount Lemmon Survey || TRE || align=right | 3.2 km || 
|-id=366 bgcolor=#d6d6d6
| 362366 ||  || — || November 1, 2005 || Mount Lemmon || Mount Lemmon Survey || THM || align=right | 3.6 km || 
|-id=367 bgcolor=#E9E9E9
| 362367 ||  || — || July 7, 2010 || WISE || WISE || — || align=right | 3.8 km || 
|-id=368 bgcolor=#E9E9E9
| 362368 ||  || — || August 12, 2001 || Palomar || NEAT || — || align=right | 3.5 km || 
|-id=369 bgcolor=#d6d6d6
| 362369 ||  || — || July 9, 2010 || WISE || WISE || — || align=right | 3.8 km || 
|-id=370 bgcolor=#E9E9E9
| 362370 ||  || — || July 9, 2010 || WISE || WISE || RAF || align=right | 1.6 km || 
|-id=371 bgcolor=#d6d6d6
| 362371 ||  || — || July 9, 2010 || WISE || WISE || — || align=right | 4.3 km || 
|-id=372 bgcolor=#d6d6d6
| 362372 ||  || — || April 3, 2008 || Kitt Peak || Spacewatch || — || align=right | 4.6 km || 
|-id=373 bgcolor=#E9E9E9
| 362373 ||  || — || October 21, 2006 || Lulin || Lulin Obs. || — || align=right | 3.5 km || 
|-id=374 bgcolor=#d6d6d6
| 362374 ||  || — || July 10, 2010 || WISE || WISE || — || align=right | 3.6 km || 
|-id=375 bgcolor=#E9E9E9
| 362375 ||  || — || July 11, 2010 || WISE || WISE || — || align=right | 2.4 km || 
|-id=376 bgcolor=#fefefe
| 362376 ||  || — || July 6, 2010 || Kitt Peak || Spacewatch || FLO || align=right data-sort-value="0.70" | 700 m || 
|-id=377 bgcolor=#d6d6d6
| 362377 ||  || — || October 7, 1999 || Catalina || CSS || ALA || align=right | 4.0 km || 
|-id=378 bgcolor=#E9E9E9
| 362378 ||  || — || July 15, 2010 || WISE || WISE || — || align=right | 2.6 km || 
|-id=379 bgcolor=#d6d6d6
| 362379 ||  || — || July 15, 2010 || WISE || WISE || — || align=right | 2.2 km || 
|-id=380 bgcolor=#d6d6d6
| 362380 ||  || — || May 6, 2008 || Mount Lemmon || Mount Lemmon Survey || — || align=right | 3.7 km || 
|-id=381 bgcolor=#E9E9E9
| 362381 ||  || — || December 13, 2006 || Mount Lemmon || Mount Lemmon Survey || — || align=right | 3.2 km || 
|-id=382 bgcolor=#E9E9E9
| 362382 ||  || — || July 12, 2010 || WISE || WISE || — || align=right | 1.8 km || 
|-id=383 bgcolor=#d6d6d6
| 362383 ||  || — || July 12, 2010 || WISE || WISE || — || align=right | 3.2 km || 
|-id=384 bgcolor=#E9E9E9
| 362384 ||  || — || July 13, 2010 || WISE || WISE || — || align=right | 2.4 km || 
|-id=385 bgcolor=#d6d6d6
| 362385 ||  || — || December 14, 2001 || Socorro || LINEAR || — || align=right | 4.3 km || 
|-id=386 bgcolor=#E9E9E9
| 362386 ||  || — || July 13, 2010 || WISE || WISE || — || align=right | 3.3 km || 
|-id=387 bgcolor=#d6d6d6
| 362387 ||  || — || October 27, 2005 || Mount Lemmon || Mount Lemmon Survey || — || align=right | 3.6 km || 
|-id=388 bgcolor=#E9E9E9
| 362388 ||  || — || March 18, 2009 || Kitt Peak || Spacewatch || — || align=right | 1.7 km || 
|-id=389 bgcolor=#fefefe
| 362389 ||  || — || April 14, 2002 || Socorro || LINEAR || — || align=right | 1.0 km || 
|-id=390 bgcolor=#d6d6d6
| 362390 ||  || — || July 21, 2010 || WISE || WISE || — || align=right | 4.0 km || 
|-id=391 bgcolor=#E9E9E9
| 362391 ||  || — || October 20, 2006 || Mount Lemmon || Mount Lemmon Survey || — || align=right | 3.1 km || 
|-id=392 bgcolor=#E9E9E9
| 362392 ||  || — || July 21, 2010 || WISE || WISE || — || align=right | 4.2 km || 
|-id=393 bgcolor=#E9E9E9
| 362393 ||  || — || July 22, 2010 || WISE || WISE || ADE || align=right | 2.3 km || 
|-id=394 bgcolor=#d6d6d6
| 362394 ||  || — || July 23, 2010 || WISE || WISE || 7:4 || align=right | 5.3 km || 
|-id=395 bgcolor=#d6d6d6
| 362395 ||  || — || April 11, 2007 || Kitt Peak || Spacewatch || — || align=right | 5.5 km || 
|-id=396 bgcolor=#E9E9E9
| 362396 ||  || — || March 15, 2008 || Kitt Peak || Spacewatch || — || align=right | 3.0 km || 
|-id=397 bgcolor=#d6d6d6
| 362397 ||  || — || July 25, 2010 || WISE || WISE || ALA || align=right | 5.4 km || 
|-id=398 bgcolor=#d6d6d6
| 362398 ||  || — || July 28, 2010 || WISE || WISE || — || align=right | 4.9 km || 
|-id=399 bgcolor=#E9E9E9
| 362399 ||  || — || October 22, 2001 || Palomar || NEAT || — || align=right | 2.3 km || 
|-id=400 bgcolor=#E9E9E9
| 362400 ||  || — || March 30, 2000 || Kitt Peak || Spacewatch || — || align=right | 1.9 km || 
|}

362401–362500 

|-bgcolor=#E9E9E9
| 362401 ||  || — || August 12, 2001 || Palomar || NEAT || JUN || align=right | 1.9 km || 
|-id=402 bgcolor=#d6d6d6
| 362402 ||  || — || July 30, 2010 || WISE || WISE || LUT || align=right | 6.1 km || 
|-id=403 bgcolor=#d6d6d6
| 362403 ||  || — || December 10, 2005 || Catalina || CSS || EUP || align=right | 4.7 km || 
|-id=404 bgcolor=#fefefe
| 362404 ||  || — || February 17, 2009 || Dauban || F. Kugel || MAS || align=right data-sort-value="0.92" | 920 m || 
|-id=405 bgcolor=#E9E9E9
| 362405 ||  || — || July 29, 2005 || Palomar || NEAT || — || align=right | 4.0 km || 
|-id=406 bgcolor=#d6d6d6
| 362406 ||  || — || May 18, 2002 || Palomar || NEAT || ALA || align=right | 4.8 km || 
|-id=407 bgcolor=#d6d6d6
| 362407 ||  || — || December 26, 2005 || Mount Lemmon || Mount Lemmon Survey || — || align=right | 5.6 km || 
|-id=408 bgcolor=#fefefe
| 362408 ||  || — || August 4, 2010 || Socorro || LINEAR || — || align=right data-sort-value="0.99" | 990 m || 
|-id=409 bgcolor=#fefefe
| 362409 ||  || — || August 5, 2010 || Socorro || LINEAR || — || align=right | 1.1 km || 
|-id=410 bgcolor=#fefefe
| 362410 ||  || — || August 5, 2010 || Socorro || LINEAR || — || align=right | 1.2 km || 
|-id=411 bgcolor=#d6d6d6
| 362411 ||  || — || September 28, 2006 || Mount Lemmon || Mount Lemmon Survey || CHA || align=right | 2.0 km || 
|-id=412 bgcolor=#d6d6d6
| 362412 ||  || — || April 4, 2008 || Kitt Peak || Spacewatch || — || align=right | 3.6 km || 
|-id=413 bgcolor=#E9E9E9
| 362413 ||  || — || April 22, 2004 || Kitt Peak || Spacewatch || HNA || align=right | 2.7 km || 
|-id=414 bgcolor=#d6d6d6
| 362414 ||  || — || March 12, 2008 || Kitt Peak || Spacewatch || — || align=right | 3.2 km || 
|-id=415 bgcolor=#fefefe
| 362415 ||  || — || August 4, 2010 || La Sagra || OAM Obs. || — || align=right data-sort-value="0.98" | 980 m || 
|-id=416 bgcolor=#fefefe
| 362416 ||  || — || September 30, 2003 || Kitt Peak || Spacewatch || MAS || align=right data-sort-value="0.97" | 970 m || 
|-id=417 bgcolor=#d6d6d6
| 362417 ||  || — || March 12, 2008 || Kitt Peak || Spacewatch || — || align=right | 4.7 km || 
|-id=418 bgcolor=#fefefe
| 362418 ||  || — || August 10, 2010 || Kitt Peak || Spacewatch || MAS || align=right data-sort-value="0.81" | 810 m || 
|-id=419 bgcolor=#d6d6d6
| 362419 ||  || — || August 9, 2010 || WISE || WISE || — || align=right | 3.9 km || 
|-id=420 bgcolor=#d6d6d6
| 362420 Rolandgarros ||  ||  || August 14, 2004 || Saint-Sulpice || B. Christophe || — || align=right | 3.8 km || 
|-id=421 bgcolor=#fefefe
| 362421 ||  || — || August 12, 2010 || Purple Mountain || PMO NEO || — || align=right | 1.3 km || 
|-id=422 bgcolor=#fefefe
| 362422 ||  || — || November 19, 2003 || Anderson Mesa || LONEOS || NYS || align=right data-sort-value="0.89" | 890 m || 
|-id=423 bgcolor=#fefefe
| 362423 ||  || — || August 7, 2010 || La Sagra || OAM Obs. || NYS || align=right data-sort-value="0.79" | 790 m || 
|-id=424 bgcolor=#fefefe
| 362424 ||  || — || September 18, 1995 || Kitt Peak || Spacewatch || NYS || align=right data-sort-value="0.85" | 850 m || 
|-id=425 bgcolor=#fefefe
| 362425 ||  || — || August 30, 2010 || La Sagra || OAM Obs. || MAS || align=right data-sort-value="0.81" | 810 m || 
|-id=426 bgcolor=#fefefe
| 362426 ||  || — || October 19, 2003 || Kitt Peak || Spacewatch || MAS || align=right data-sort-value="0.73" | 730 m || 
|-id=427 bgcolor=#fefefe
| 362427 ||  || — || August 16, 2010 || La Sagra || OAM Obs. || MAS || align=right data-sort-value="0.82" | 820 m || 
|-id=428 bgcolor=#E9E9E9
| 362428 ||  || — || September 1, 2010 || Mount Lemmon || Mount Lemmon Survey || — || align=right | 2.0 km || 
|-id=429 bgcolor=#fefefe
| 362429 ||  || — || September 1, 2010 || ESA OGS || ESA OGS || NYS || align=right data-sort-value="0.76" | 760 m || 
|-id=430 bgcolor=#d6d6d6
| 362430 ||  || — || January 18, 2008 || Mount Lemmon || Mount Lemmon Survey || — || align=right | 3.3 km || 
|-id=431 bgcolor=#E9E9E9
| 362431 ||  || — || September 2, 2010 || Socorro || LINEAR || — || align=right | 1.6 km || 
|-id=432 bgcolor=#d6d6d6
| 362432 ||  || — || October 6, 2005 || Kitt Peak || Spacewatch || — || align=right | 2.9 km || 
|-id=433 bgcolor=#fefefe
| 362433 ||  || — || September 4, 2010 || Kitt Peak || Spacewatch || NYS || align=right data-sort-value="0.82" | 820 m || 
|-id=434 bgcolor=#d6d6d6
| 362434 ||  || — || September 4, 2010 || Kitt Peak || Spacewatch || EOS || align=right | 2.6 km || 
|-id=435 bgcolor=#E9E9E9
| 362435 ||  || — || April 7, 1999 || Kitt Peak || Spacewatch || WAT || align=right | 1.9 km || 
|-id=436 bgcolor=#d6d6d6
| 362436 ||  || — || September 4, 2010 || La Sagra || OAM Obs. || — || align=right | 3.5 km || 
|-id=437 bgcolor=#fefefe
| 362437 ||  || — || September 4, 2010 || La Sagra || OAM Obs. || NYS || align=right data-sort-value="0.86" | 860 m || 
|-id=438 bgcolor=#fefefe
| 362438 ||  || — || May 25, 2006 || Kitt Peak || Spacewatch || ERI || align=right | 1.3 km || 
|-id=439 bgcolor=#fefefe
| 362439 ||  || — || October 1, 1999 || Kitt Peak || Spacewatch || — || align=right data-sort-value="0.79" | 790 m || 
|-id=440 bgcolor=#E9E9E9
| 362440 ||  || — || October 21, 2006 || Mount Lemmon || Mount Lemmon Survey || — || align=right | 1.8 km || 
|-id=441 bgcolor=#E9E9E9
| 362441 ||  || — || October 19, 2006 || Mount Lemmon || Mount Lemmon Survey || — || align=right | 1.3 km || 
|-id=442 bgcolor=#fefefe
| 362442 ||  || — || September 2, 2010 || Mount Lemmon || Mount Lemmon Survey || — || align=right | 1.0 km || 
|-id=443 bgcolor=#fefefe
| 362443 ||  || — || May 7, 2002 || Palomar || NEAT || NYS || align=right data-sort-value="0.79" | 790 m || 
|-id=444 bgcolor=#E9E9E9
| 362444 ||  || — || September 10, 2010 || Kitt Peak || Spacewatch || WIT || align=right | 1.1 km || 
|-id=445 bgcolor=#E9E9E9
| 362445 ||  || — || October 2, 2006 || Kitt Peak || Spacewatch || — || align=right | 1.0 km || 
|-id=446 bgcolor=#E9E9E9
| 362446 ||  || — || October 2, 1997 || Mauna Kea || C. Veillet, R. Shank || EUN || align=right | 1.4 km || 
|-id=447 bgcolor=#E9E9E9
| 362447 ||  || — || February 7, 2008 || Mount Lemmon || Mount Lemmon Survey || — || align=right | 2.7 km || 
|-id=448 bgcolor=#E9E9E9
| 362448 ||  || — || August 28, 2005 || Kitt Peak || Spacewatch || HEN || align=right | 1.3 km || 
|-id=449 bgcolor=#d6d6d6
| 362449 ||  || — || September 10, 2010 || Kitt Peak || Spacewatch || — || align=right | 3.2 km || 
|-id=450 bgcolor=#d6d6d6
| 362450 ||  || — || March 31, 2008 || Kitt Peak || Spacewatch || — || align=right | 2.5 km || 
|-id=451 bgcolor=#E9E9E9
| 362451 ||  || — || September 27, 2006 || Kitt Peak || Spacewatch || — || align=right | 1.2 km || 
|-id=452 bgcolor=#fefefe
| 362452 ||  || — || September 11, 2010 || Kitt Peak || Spacewatch || MAS || align=right data-sort-value="0.88" | 880 m || 
|-id=453 bgcolor=#E9E9E9
| 362453 ||  || — || October 29, 1998 || Kitt Peak || Spacewatch || — || align=right data-sort-value="0.85" | 850 m || 
|-id=454 bgcolor=#d6d6d6
| 362454 ||  || — || April 7, 2008 || Kitt Peak || Spacewatch || — || align=right | 2.9 km || 
|-id=455 bgcolor=#fefefe
| 362455 ||  || — || May 10, 2002 || Socorro || LINEAR || MAS || align=right data-sort-value="0.96" | 960 m || 
|-id=456 bgcolor=#d6d6d6
| 362456 ||  || — || January 28, 2007 || Mount Lemmon || Mount Lemmon Survey || — || align=right | 3.1 km || 
|-id=457 bgcolor=#fefefe
| 362457 ||  || — || October 20, 2003 || Kitt Peak || Spacewatch || MAS || align=right data-sort-value="0.85" | 850 m || 
|-id=458 bgcolor=#d6d6d6
| 362458 ||  || — || August 28, 2005 || Kitt Peak || Spacewatch || KOR || align=right | 1.4 km || 
|-id=459 bgcolor=#d6d6d6
| 362459 ||  || — || February 8, 2008 || Kitt Peak || Spacewatch || CHA || align=right | 2.1 km || 
|-id=460 bgcolor=#d6d6d6
| 362460 ||  || — || August 25, 2004 || Kitt Peak || Spacewatch || — || align=right | 3.5 km || 
|-id=461 bgcolor=#d6d6d6
| 362461 ||  || — || March 11, 2007 || Mount Lemmon || Mount Lemmon Survey || EUP || align=right | 3.5 km || 
|-id=462 bgcolor=#E9E9E9
| 362462 ||  || — || March 28, 2008 || Mount Lemmon || Mount Lemmon Survey || — || align=right | 2.3 km || 
|-id=463 bgcolor=#E9E9E9
| 362463 ||  || — || September 12, 2001 || Kitt Peak || M. W. Buie || NEM || align=right | 2.1 km || 
|-id=464 bgcolor=#E9E9E9
| 362464 ||  || — || September 25, 2006 || Kitt Peak || Spacewatch || — || align=right | 1.0 km || 
|-id=465 bgcolor=#E9E9E9
| 362465 ||  || — || October 4, 2006 || Mount Lemmon || Mount Lemmon Survey || — || align=right | 1.5 km || 
|-id=466 bgcolor=#d6d6d6
| 362466 ||  || — || February 27, 2007 || Kitt Peak || Spacewatch || EOS || align=right | 2.1 km || 
|-id=467 bgcolor=#E9E9E9
| 362467 ||  || — || February 9, 2008 || Mount Lemmon || Mount Lemmon Survey || — || align=right | 2.2 km || 
|-id=468 bgcolor=#d6d6d6
| 362468 ||  || — || September 3, 2010 || Mount Lemmon || Mount Lemmon Survey || BRA || align=right | 1.8 km || 
|-id=469 bgcolor=#E9E9E9
| 362469 ||  || — || September 30, 2006 || Mount Lemmon || Mount Lemmon Survey || — || align=right | 1.9 km || 
|-id=470 bgcolor=#d6d6d6
| 362470 ||  || — || September 11, 2010 || Kitt Peak || Spacewatch || — || align=right | 3.6 km || 
|-id=471 bgcolor=#E9E9E9
| 362471 ||  || — || August 27, 2005 || Palomar || NEAT || — || align=right | 2.4 km || 
|-id=472 bgcolor=#E9E9E9
| 362472 ||  || — || November 13, 2002 || Palomar || NEAT || MAR || align=right | 1.2 km || 
|-id=473 bgcolor=#E9E9E9
| 362473 ||  || — || September 26, 2006 || Mount Lemmon || Mount Lemmon Survey || — || align=right | 1.3 km || 
|-id=474 bgcolor=#E9E9E9
| 362474 ||  || — || January 28, 2003 || Kitt Peak || Spacewatch || AGN || align=right | 1.1 km || 
|-id=475 bgcolor=#fefefe
| 362475 ||  || — || February 16, 2005 || La Silla || A. Boattini, H. Scholl || MAS || align=right data-sort-value="0.75" | 750 m || 
|-id=476 bgcolor=#d6d6d6
| 362476 ||  || — || September 27, 2010 || Kitt Peak || Spacewatch || KOR || align=right | 1.6 km || 
|-id=477 bgcolor=#d6d6d6
| 362477 ||  || — || September 9, 2010 || Kitt Peak || Spacewatch || VER || align=right | 3.4 km || 
|-id=478 bgcolor=#d6d6d6
| 362478 ||  || — || March 31, 2008 || Mount Lemmon || Mount Lemmon Survey || — || align=right | 3.0 km || 
|-id=479 bgcolor=#E9E9E9
| 362479 ||  || — || February 29, 2004 || Kitt Peak || Spacewatch || — || align=right | 2.1 km || 
|-id=480 bgcolor=#d6d6d6
| 362480 ||  || — || February 12, 2008 || Kitt Peak || Spacewatch || — || align=right | 2.2 km || 
|-id=481 bgcolor=#d6d6d6
| 362481 ||  || — || March 3, 1997 || Kitt Peak || Spacewatch || — || align=right | 2.6 km || 
|-id=482 bgcolor=#d6d6d6
| 362482 ||  || — || February 1, 2008 || Mount Lemmon || Mount Lemmon Survey || CHA || align=right | 2.2 km || 
|-id=483 bgcolor=#FA8072
| 362483 ||  || — || February 2, 2009 || Kitt Peak || Spacewatch || — || align=right | 1.1 km || 
|-id=484 bgcolor=#E9E9E9
| 362484 ||  || — || August 28, 2006 || Catalina || CSS || — || align=right | 2.6 km || 
|-id=485 bgcolor=#E9E9E9
| 362485 ||  || — || September 28, 2006 || Kitt Peak || Spacewatch || MAR || align=right | 1.4 km || 
|-id=486 bgcolor=#d6d6d6
| 362486 ||  || — || April 29, 2008 || Kitt Peak || Spacewatch || — || align=right | 3.2 km || 
|-id=487 bgcolor=#d6d6d6
| 362487 ||  || — || December 1, 2005 || Kitt Peak || Spacewatch || — || align=right | 2.5 km || 
|-id=488 bgcolor=#E9E9E9
| 362488 ||  || — || September 9, 2010 || Kitt Peak || Spacewatch || — || align=right | 2.5 km || 
|-id=489 bgcolor=#d6d6d6
| 362489 ||  || — || October 23, 2005 || Catalina || CSS || EOS || align=right | 2.0 km || 
|-id=490 bgcolor=#d6d6d6
| 362490 ||  || — || August 23, 2004 || Kitt Peak || Spacewatch || EOS || align=right | 2.1 km || 
|-id=491 bgcolor=#E9E9E9
| 362491 ||  || — || March 5, 2008 || Mount Lemmon || Mount Lemmon Survey || WIT || align=right data-sort-value="0.95" | 950 m || 
|-id=492 bgcolor=#d6d6d6
| 362492 ||  || — || October 14, 2004 || Anderson Mesa || LONEOS || EUP || align=right | 4.4 km || 
|-id=493 bgcolor=#d6d6d6
| 362493 ||  || — || October 23, 2005 || Catalina || CSS || EOS || align=right | 2.6 km || 
|-id=494 bgcolor=#E9E9E9
| 362494 ||  || — || November 20, 2006 || Kitt Peak || Spacewatch || AGN || align=right | 1.2 km || 
|-id=495 bgcolor=#E9E9E9
| 362495 ||  || — || February 9, 2008 || Kitt Peak || Spacewatch || HOF || align=right | 2.4 km || 
|-id=496 bgcolor=#d6d6d6
| 362496 ||  || — || March 6, 2008 || Mount Lemmon || Mount Lemmon Survey || CHA || align=right | 2.2 km || 
|-id=497 bgcolor=#d6d6d6
| 362497 ||  || — || May 5, 2008 || Mount Lemmon || Mount Lemmon Survey || — || align=right | 2.8 km || 
|-id=498 bgcolor=#d6d6d6
| 362498 ||  || — || September 20, 2000 || Kitt Peak || M. W. Buie || — || align=right | 2.2 km || 
|-id=499 bgcolor=#E9E9E9
| 362499 ||  || — || October 12, 2006 || Kitt Peak || Spacewatch || BRG || align=right | 1.4 km || 
|-id=500 bgcolor=#d6d6d6
| 362500 ||  || — || February 23, 2007 || Kitt Peak || Spacewatch || — || align=right | 2.3 km || 
|}

362501–362600 

|-bgcolor=#E9E9E9
| 362501 ||  || — || April 13, 2008 || Mount Lemmon || Mount Lemmon Survey || — || align=right | 3.0 km || 
|-id=502 bgcolor=#E9E9E9
| 362502 ||  || — || September 18, 2006 || Catalina || CSS || — || align=right | 1.8 km || 
|-id=503 bgcolor=#E9E9E9
| 362503 ||  || — || October 20, 2006 || Kitt Peak || Spacewatch || MRX || align=right | 1.1 km || 
|-id=504 bgcolor=#d6d6d6
| 362504 ||  || — || October 22, 2005 || Kitt Peak || Spacewatch || — || align=right | 2.7 km || 
|-id=505 bgcolor=#d6d6d6
| 362505 ||  || — || October 1, 2005 || Mount Lemmon || Mount Lemmon Survey || — || align=right | 2.5 km || 
|-id=506 bgcolor=#d6d6d6
| 362506 ||  || — || September 30, 2005 || Kitt Peak || Spacewatch || — || align=right | 2.3 km || 
|-id=507 bgcolor=#d6d6d6
| 362507 ||  || — || October 6, 1999 || Socorro || LINEAR || — || align=right | 3.9 km || 
|-id=508 bgcolor=#E9E9E9
| 362508 ||  || — || September 30, 2006 || Mount Lemmon || Mount Lemmon Survey || — || align=right data-sort-value="0.96" | 960 m || 
|-id=509 bgcolor=#d6d6d6
| 362509 ||  || — || September 18, 2010 || Mount Lemmon || Mount Lemmon Survey || EOS || align=right | 1.9 km || 
|-id=510 bgcolor=#d6d6d6
| 362510 ||  || — || November 6, 2005 || Mount Lemmon || Mount Lemmon Survey || HYG || align=right | 2.7 km || 
|-id=511 bgcolor=#fefefe
| 362511 ||  || — || August 8, 2002 || Palomar || NEAT || NYS || align=right data-sort-value="0.78" | 780 m || 
|-id=512 bgcolor=#E9E9E9
| 362512 ||  || — || October 14, 2001 || Kitt Peak || Spacewatch || AST || align=right | 1.6 km || 
|-id=513 bgcolor=#E9E9E9
| 362513 ||  || — || October 21, 2001 || Kitt Peak || Spacewatch || HEN || align=right | 1.1 km || 
|-id=514 bgcolor=#E9E9E9
| 362514 ||  || — || February 2, 2008 || Kitt Peak || Spacewatch || — || align=right | 2.6 km || 
|-id=515 bgcolor=#d6d6d6
| 362515 ||  || — || March 28, 2008 || Kitt Peak || Spacewatch || EOS || align=right | 2.2 km || 
|-id=516 bgcolor=#d6d6d6
| 362516 ||  || — || September 14, 2005 || Kitt Peak || Spacewatch || CHA || align=right | 1.9 km || 
|-id=517 bgcolor=#d6d6d6
| 362517 ||  || — || December 15, 2006 || Kitt Peak || Spacewatch || — || align=right | 2.4 km || 
|-id=518 bgcolor=#d6d6d6
| 362518 ||  || — || September 12, 2010 || Kitt Peak || Spacewatch || — || align=right | 3.0 km || 
|-id=519 bgcolor=#E9E9E9
| 362519 ||  || — || July 7, 2005 || Kitt Peak || Spacewatch || HEN || align=right | 1.5 km || 
|-id=520 bgcolor=#d6d6d6
| 362520 ||  || — || September 17, 2004 || Socorro || LINEAR || — || align=right | 4.7 km || 
|-id=521 bgcolor=#d6d6d6
| 362521 ||  || — || January 27, 2007 || Kitt Peak || Spacewatch || — || align=right | 2.7 km || 
|-id=522 bgcolor=#d6d6d6
| 362522 ||  || — || October 12, 2005 || Kitt Peak || Spacewatch || — || align=right | 2.1 km || 
|-id=523 bgcolor=#E9E9E9
| 362523 ||  || — || July 29, 2005 || Palomar || NEAT || — || align=right | 3.0 km || 
|-id=524 bgcolor=#d6d6d6
| 362524 ||  || — || September 11, 2004 || Socorro || LINEAR || EOS || align=right | 2.6 km || 
|-id=525 bgcolor=#d6d6d6
| 362525 ||  || — || November 5, 2005 || Kitt Peak || Spacewatch || THM || align=right | 2.4 km || 
|-id=526 bgcolor=#d6d6d6
| 362526 ||  || — || October 30, 2005 || Mount Lemmon || Mount Lemmon Survey || — || align=right | 2.4 km || 
|-id=527 bgcolor=#d6d6d6
| 362527 ||  || — || January 24, 2007 || Mount Lemmon || Mount Lemmon Survey || KOR || align=right | 1.4 km || 
|-id=528 bgcolor=#E9E9E9
| 362528 ||  || — || August 31, 2005 || Kitt Peak || Spacewatch || — || align=right | 2.2 km || 
|-id=529 bgcolor=#d6d6d6
| 362529 ||  || — || July 25, 2010 || WISE || WISE || — || align=right | 3.2 km || 
|-id=530 bgcolor=#d6d6d6
| 362530 ||  || — || October 17, 2010 || Mount Lemmon || Mount Lemmon Survey || — || align=right | 3.6 km || 
|-id=531 bgcolor=#d6d6d6
| 362531 ||  || — || October 8, 2004 || Kitt Peak || Spacewatch || URS || align=right | 4.4 km || 
|-id=532 bgcolor=#d6d6d6
| 362532 ||  || — || November 5, 1999 || Kitt Peak || Spacewatch || ALA || align=right | 5.0 km || 
|-id=533 bgcolor=#d6d6d6
| 362533 ||  || — || December 7, 2005 || Kitt Peak || Spacewatch || — || align=right | 3.1 km || 
|-id=534 bgcolor=#E9E9E9
| 362534 ||  || — || May 20, 2004 || Kitt Peak || Spacewatch || — || align=right | 3.1 km || 
|-id=535 bgcolor=#E9E9E9
| 362535 ||  || — || September 27, 2006 || Mount Lemmon || Mount Lemmon Survey || — || align=right | 1.6 km || 
|-id=536 bgcolor=#d6d6d6
| 362536 ||  || — || March 26, 2007 || Mount Lemmon || Mount Lemmon Survey || SYL7:4 || align=right | 4.3 km || 
|-id=537 bgcolor=#d6d6d6
| 362537 ||  || — || March 10, 2002 || Kitt Peak || Spacewatch || EOS || align=right | 1.8 km || 
|-id=538 bgcolor=#d6d6d6
| 362538 ||  || — || April 4, 2002 || Kitt Peak || Spacewatch || EOS || align=right | 2.3 km || 
|-id=539 bgcolor=#d6d6d6
| 362539 ||  || — || October 22, 2005 || Kitt Peak || Spacewatch || — || align=right | 2.8 km || 
|-id=540 bgcolor=#E9E9E9
| 362540 ||  || — || April 17, 2009 || Kitt Peak || Spacewatch || — || align=right data-sort-value="0.94" | 940 m || 
|-id=541 bgcolor=#d6d6d6
| 362541 ||  || — || October 30, 2005 || Mount Lemmon || Mount Lemmon Survey || — || align=right | 2.5 km || 
|-id=542 bgcolor=#d6d6d6
| 362542 ||  || — || February 27, 2007 || Kitt Peak || Spacewatch || — || align=right | 3.0 km || 
|-id=543 bgcolor=#d6d6d6
| 362543 ||  || — || March 11, 2007 || Mount Lemmon || Mount Lemmon Survey || — || align=right | 3.5 km || 
|-id=544 bgcolor=#d6d6d6
| 362544 ||  || — || August 10, 2010 || Kitt Peak || Spacewatch || EOS || align=right | 2.3 km || 
|-id=545 bgcolor=#d6d6d6
| 362545 ||  || — || April 5, 2008 || Kitt Peak || Spacewatch || URS || align=right | 3.2 km || 
|-id=546 bgcolor=#d6d6d6
| 362546 ||  || — || December 8, 2005 || Kitt Peak || Spacewatch || EOS || align=right | 2.5 km || 
|-id=547 bgcolor=#E9E9E9
| 362547 ||  || — || April 30, 2005 || Kitt Peak || Spacewatch || — || align=right | 1.2 km || 
|-id=548 bgcolor=#d6d6d6
| 362548 ||  || — || August 16, 2009 || Catalina || CSS || — || align=right | 3.8 km || 
|-id=549 bgcolor=#d6d6d6
| 362549 ||  || — || October 27, 2005 || Mount Lemmon || Mount Lemmon Survey || — || align=right | 2.8 km || 
|-id=550 bgcolor=#E9E9E9
| 362550 ||  || — || October 1, 2005 || Catalina || CSS || — || align=right | 2.7 km || 
|-id=551 bgcolor=#d6d6d6
| 362551 ||  || — || February 23, 2007 || Kitt Peak || Spacewatch || — || align=right | 3.1 km || 
|-id=552 bgcolor=#d6d6d6
| 362552 ||  || — || September 10, 2004 || Kitt Peak || Spacewatch || CRO || align=right | 2.9 km || 
|-id=553 bgcolor=#d6d6d6
| 362553 ||  || — || October 9, 2010 || Catalina || CSS || — || align=right | 3.9 km || 
|-id=554 bgcolor=#d6d6d6
| 362554 ||  || — || November 30, 2005 || Junk Bond || D. Healy || — || align=right | 2.8 km || 
|-id=555 bgcolor=#E9E9E9
| 362555 ||  || — || August 11, 2001 || Palomar || NEAT || — || align=right | 2.5 km || 
|-id=556 bgcolor=#d6d6d6
| 362556 ||  || — || October 11, 2010 || Catalina || CSS || — || align=right | 3.7 km || 
|-id=557 bgcolor=#d6d6d6
| 362557 ||  || — || March 25, 2007 || Mount Lemmon || Mount Lemmon Survey || 7:4 || align=right | 4.7 km || 
|-id=558 bgcolor=#d6d6d6
| 362558 ||  || — || October 29, 2005 || Kitt Peak || Spacewatch || — || align=right | 3.0 km || 
|-id=559 bgcolor=#d6d6d6
| 362559 ||  || — || October 13, 2010 || Antares || R. Holmes, T. Vorobjov || — || align=right | 2.9 km || 
|-id=560 bgcolor=#d6d6d6
| 362560 ||  || — || September 14, 2004 || Anderson Mesa || LONEOS || — || align=right | 3.1 km || 
|-id=561 bgcolor=#d6d6d6
| 362561 ||  || — || October 26, 2005 || Kitt Peak || Spacewatch || K-2 || align=right | 1.5 km || 
|-id=562 bgcolor=#d6d6d6
| 362562 ||  || — || December 6, 2005 || Kitt Peak || Spacewatch || — || align=right | 3.8 km || 
|-id=563 bgcolor=#E9E9E9
| 362563 ||  || — || November 7, 2002 || Apache Point || SDSS || — || align=right | 2.1 km || 
|-id=564 bgcolor=#d6d6d6
| 362564 ||  || — || April 1, 2008 || Kitt Peak || Spacewatch || EOS || align=right | 2.0 km || 
|-id=565 bgcolor=#d6d6d6
| 362565 ||  || — || August 6, 2010 || WISE || WISE || — || align=right | 5.9 km || 
|-id=566 bgcolor=#d6d6d6
| 362566 ||  || — || May 5, 2008 || Mount Lemmon || Mount Lemmon Survey || VER || align=right | 3.3 km || 
|-id=567 bgcolor=#d6d6d6
| 362567 ||  || — || September 30, 2005 || Mount Lemmon || Mount Lemmon Survey || EOS || align=right | 1.9 km || 
|-id=568 bgcolor=#d6d6d6
| 362568 ||  || — || February 23, 2007 || Kitt Peak || Spacewatch || — || align=right | 3.8 km || 
|-id=569 bgcolor=#d6d6d6
| 362569 ||  || — || November 1, 2010 || Kitt Peak || Spacewatch || — || align=right | 4.2 km || 
|-id=570 bgcolor=#E9E9E9
| 362570 ||  || — || September 30, 2006 || Mount Lemmon || Mount Lemmon Survey || — || align=right | 1.3 km || 
|-id=571 bgcolor=#d6d6d6
| 362571 ||  || — || November 6, 2010 || Kitt Peak || Spacewatch || HYG || align=right | 3.4 km || 
|-id=572 bgcolor=#d6d6d6
| 362572 ||  || — || November 6, 2010 || Kitt Peak || Spacewatch || — || align=right | 4.6 km || 
|-id=573 bgcolor=#d6d6d6
| 362573 ||  || — || June 4, 2003 || Kitt Peak || Spacewatch || — || align=right | 4.4 km || 
|-id=574 bgcolor=#d6d6d6
| 362574 ||  || — || March 12, 2007 || Catalina || CSS || EOS || align=right | 2.6 km || 
|-id=575 bgcolor=#E9E9E9
| 362575 ||  || — || May 12, 2005 || Mount Lemmon || Mount Lemmon Survey || — || align=right data-sort-value="0.98" | 980 m || 
|-id=576 bgcolor=#d6d6d6
| 362576 ||  || — || September 15, 2004 || Anderson Mesa || LONEOS || EOS || align=right | 2.2 km || 
|-id=577 bgcolor=#d6d6d6
| 362577 ||  || — || November 25, 2005 || Mount Lemmon || Mount Lemmon Survey || — || align=right | 2.8 km || 
|-id=578 bgcolor=#d6d6d6
| 362578 ||  || — || April 2, 2002 || Kitt Peak || Spacewatch || — || align=right | 3.4 km || 
|-id=579 bgcolor=#d6d6d6
| 362579 ||  || — || October 11, 2005 || Kitt Peak || Spacewatch || — || align=right | 3.7 km || 
|-id=580 bgcolor=#d6d6d6
| 362580 ||  || — || November 26, 2005 || Catalina || CSS || BRA || align=right | 2.0 km || 
|-id=581 bgcolor=#E9E9E9
| 362581 ||  || — || July 21, 2001 || Haleakala || NEAT || — || align=right | 1.8 km || 
|-id=582 bgcolor=#d6d6d6
| 362582 ||  || — || August 10, 2004 || Anderson Mesa || LONEOS || — || align=right | 4.0 km || 
|-id=583 bgcolor=#d6d6d6
| 362583 ||  || — || September 30, 2010 || Mount Lemmon || Mount Lemmon Survey || THM || align=right | 2.5 km || 
|-id=584 bgcolor=#d6d6d6
| 362584 ||  || — || May 29, 2008 || Kitt Peak || Spacewatch || CRO || align=right | 3.4 km || 
|-id=585 bgcolor=#d6d6d6
| 362585 ||  || — || May 12, 1996 || Kitt Peak || Spacewatch || — || align=right | 4.0 km || 
|-id=586 bgcolor=#d6d6d6
| 362586 ||  || — || March 29, 2008 || Kitt Peak || Spacewatch || — || align=right | 3.6 km || 
|-id=587 bgcolor=#d6d6d6
| 362587 ||  || — || February 16, 2007 || Catalina || CSS || EOS || align=right | 2.4 km || 
|-id=588 bgcolor=#E9E9E9
| 362588 ||  || — || June 17, 1996 || Lime Creek || R. Linderholm || JUN || align=right | 1.5 km || 
|-id=589 bgcolor=#d6d6d6
| 362589 ||  || — || November 30, 2005 || Mount Lemmon || Mount Lemmon Survey || — || align=right | 3.5 km || 
|-id=590 bgcolor=#d6d6d6
| 362590 ||  || — || October 7, 2005 || Catalina || CSS || BRA || align=right | 1.7 km || 
|-id=591 bgcolor=#d6d6d6
| 362591 ||  || — || February 23, 2007 || Mount Lemmon || Mount Lemmon Survey || VER || align=right | 3.1 km || 
|-id=592 bgcolor=#d6d6d6
| 362592 ||  || — || October 7, 1999 || Kitt Peak || Spacewatch || — || align=right | 3.5 km || 
|-id=593 bgcolor=#E9E9E9
| 362593 ||  || — || December 21, 2006 || Kitt Peak || Spacewatch || HEN || align=right | 1.0 km || 
|-id=594 bgcolor=#d6d6d6
| 362594 ||  || — || October 22, 2005 || Kitt Peak || Spacewatch || CHA || align=right | 2.3 km || 
|-id=595 bgcolor=#d6d6d6
| 362595 ||  || — || July 7, 2003 || Kitt Peak || Spacewatch || — || align=right | 4.3 km || 
|-id=596 bgcolor=#d6d6d6
| 362596 ||  || — || September 1, 2005 || Palomar || NEAT || — || align=right | 3.0 km || 
|-id=597 bgcolor=#E9E9E9
| 362597 ||  || — || August 24, 2001 || Palomar || NEAT || — || align=right | 2.3 km || 
|-id=598 bgcolor=#d6d6d6
| 362598 ||  || — || November 1, 1999 || Kitt Peak || Spacewatch || — || align=right | 3.6 km || 
|-id=599 bgcolor=#d6d6d6
| 362599 ||  || — || March 25, 2007 || Mount Lemmon || Mount Lemmon Survey || — || align=right | 3.6 km || 
|-id=600 bgcolor=#d6d6d6
| 362600 ||  || — || November 27, 2010 || Mount Lemmon || Mount Lemmon Survey || VER || align=right | 3.8 km || 
|}

362601–362700 

|-bgcolor=#E9E9E9
| 362601 ||  || — || August 10, 2010 || Kitt Peak || Spacewatch || — || align=right | 2.1 km || 
|-id=602 bgcolor=#d6d6d6
| 362602 ||  || — || October 7, 2004 || Socorro || LINEAR || — || align=right | 3.9 km || 
|-id=603 bgcolor=#d6d6d6
| 362603 ||  || — || December 27, 2005 || Kitt Peak || Spacewatch || — || align=right | 3.6 km || 
|-id=604 bgcolor=#d6d6d6
| 362604 ||  || — || September 16, 2009 || Mount Lemmon || Mount Lemmon Survey || — || align=right | 3.8 km || 
|-id=605 bgcolor=#E9E9E9
| 362605 ||  || — || September 30, 2005 || Anderson Mesa || LONEOS || — || align=right | 3.1 km || 
|-id=606 bgcolor=#E9E9E9
| 362606 ||  || — || September 27, 2005 || Kitt Peak || Spacewatch || — || align=right | 2.8 km || 
|-id=607 bgcolor=#d6d6d6
| 362607 ||  || — || October 4, 1994 || Kitt Peak || Spacewatch || — || align=right | 3.2 km || 
|-id=608 bgcolor=#d6d6d6
| 362608 ||  || — || January 16, 2004 || Kitt Peak || Spacewatch || 3:2 || align=right | 5.7 km || 
|-id=609 bgcolor=#d6d6d6
| 362609 ||  || — || July 8, 2003 || Palomar || NEAT || EOS || align=right | 2.9 km || 
|-id=610 bgcolor=#fefefe
| 362610 ||  || — || September 25, 2006 || Catalina || CSS || H || align=right | 1.1 km || 
|-id=611 bgcolor=#fefefe
| 362611 ||  || — || February 3, 2009 || Mount Lemmon || Mount Lemmon Survey || — || align=right data-sort-value="0.80" | 800 m || 
|-id=612 bgcolor=#fefefe
| 362612 ||  || — || October 30, 2000 || Socorro || LINEAR || H || align=right data-sort-value="0.93" | 930 m || 
|-id=613 bgcolor=#fefefe
| 362613 ||  || — || September 30, 2005 || Mount Lemmon || Mount Lemmon Survey || — || align=right data-sort-value="0.88" | 880 m || 
|-id=614 bgcolor=#fefefe
| 362614 ||  || — || January 8, 2002 || Socorro || LINEAR || — || align=right data-sort-value="0.77" | 770 m || 
|-id=615 bgcolor=#E9E9E9
| 362615 ||  || — || November 2, 2007 || Kitt Peak || Spacewatch || ADE || align=right | 1.8 km || 
|-id=616 bgcolor=#d6d6d6
| 362616 ||  || — || January 20, 2009 || Mount Lemmon || Mount Lemmon Survey || — || align=right | 4.5 km || 
|-id=617 bgcolor=#fefefe
| 362617 ||  || — || March 23, 2003 || Kitt Peak || Spacewatch || — || align=right | 1.0 km || 
|-id=618 bgcolor=#fefefe
| 362618 ||  || — || October 11, 1994 || Kitt Peak || Spacewatch || V || align=right data-sort-value="0.72" | 720 m || 
|-id=619 bgcolor=#E9E9E9
| 362619 ||  || — || January 26, 2004 || Anderson Mesa || LONEOS || — || align=right | 1.3 km || 
|-id=620 bgcolor=#fefefe
| 362620 ||  || — || December 22, 2008 || Mount Lemmon || Mount Lemmon Survey || — || align=right data-sort-value="0.95" | 950 m || 
|-id=621 bgcolor=#fefefe
| 362621 ||  || — || July 3, 2011 || Mount Lemmon || Mount Lemmon Survey || FLO || align=right data-sort-value="0.71" | 710 m || 
|-id=622 bgcolor=#fefefe
| 362622 ||  || — || September 5, 2007 || Catalina || CSS || — || align=right | 2.1 km || 
|-id=623 bgcolor=#fefefe
| 362623 ||  || — || March 5, 2000 || Socorro || LINEAR || H || align=right data-sort-value="0.81" | 810 m || 
|-id=624 bgcolor=#fefefe
| 362624 ||  || — || March 13, 2002 || Socorro || LINEAR || ERI || align=right | 1.7 km || 
|-id=625 bgcolor=#E9E9E9
| 362625 ||  || — || January 19, 2008 || Mount Lemmon || Mount Lemmon Survey || — || align=right | 2.1 km || 
|-id=626 bgcolor=#fefefe
| 362626 ||  || — || September 10, 2004 || Socorro || LINEAR || — || align=right data-sort-value="0.89" | 890 m || 
|-id=627 bgcolor=#fefefe
| 362627 ||  || — || October 31, 2000 || Socorro || LINEAR || — || align=right data-sort-value="0.91" | 910 m || 
|-id=628 bgcolor=#fefefe
| 362628 ||  || — || September 16, 2001 || Socorro || LINEAR || FLO || align=right data-sort-value="0.60" | 600 m || 
|-id=629 bgcolor=#E9E9E9
| 362629 ||  || — || January 1, 2008 || Catalina || CSS || — || align=right | 2.7 km || 
|-id=630 bgcolor=#fefefe
| 362630 ||  || — || March 19, 2009 || Kitt Peak || Spacewatch || — || align=right data-sort-value="0.83" | 830 m || 
|-id=631 bgcolor=#E9E9E9
| 362631 ||  || — || July 5, 2011 || Haleakala || Pan-STARRS || — || align=right | 1.9 km || 
|-id=632 bgcolor=#fefefe
| 362632 ||  || — || December 10, 2004 || Socorro || LINEAR || MAS || align=right data-sort-value="0.82" | 820 m || 
|-id=633 bgcolor=#fefefe
| 362633 ||  || — || September 21, 2000 || Kitt Peak || Spacewatch || — || align=right data-sort-value="0.92" | 920 m || 
|-id=634 bgcolor=#fefefe
| 362634 ||  || — || March 12, 2002 || Anderson Mesa || LONEOS || H || align=right data-sort-value="0.84" | 840 m || 
|-id=635 bgcolor=#fefefe
| 362635 ||  || — || February 27, 2009 || Catalina || CSS || — || align=right data-sort-value="0.92" | 920 m || 
|-id=636 bgcolor=#fefefe
| 362636 ||  || — || December 16, 2004 || Socorro || LINEAR || NYS || align=right data-sort-value="0.74" | 740 m || 
|-id=637 bgcolor=#fefefe
| 362637 ||  || — || November 7, 2008 || Mount Lemmon || Mount Lemmon Survey || — || align=right data-sort-value="0.80" | 800 m || 
|-id=638 bgcolor=#fefefe
| 362638 ||  || — || October 3, 2008 || Mount Lemmon || Mount Lemmon Survey || — || align=right data-sort-value="0.73" | 730 m || 
|-id=639 bgcolor=#fefefe
| 362639 ||  || — || April 30, 2006 || Kitt Peak || Spacewatch || — || align=right | 1.1 km || 
|-id=640 bgcolor=#E9E9E9
| 362640 ||  || — || September 12, 2002 || Palomar || NEAT || — || align=right | 1.5 km || 
|-id=641 bgcolor=#fefefe
| 362641 ||  || — || December 18, 2001 || Socorro || LINEAR || — || align=right data-sort-value="0.92" | 920 m || 
|-id=642 bgcolor=#fefefe
| 362642 ||  || — || November 4, 2004 || Catalina || CSS || V || align=right data-sort-value="0.73" | 730 m || 
|-id=643 bgcolor=#fefefe
| 362643 ||  || — || May 25, 2006 || Mauna Kea || P. A. Wiegert || NYS || align=right data-sort-value="0.81" | 810 m || 
|-id=644 bgcolor=#fefefe
| 362644 ||  || — || February 4, 2006 || 7300 Observatory || W. K. Y. Yeung || FLO || align=right data-sort-value="0.62" | 620 m || 
|-id=645 bgcolor=#fefefe
| 362645 ||  || — || January 25, 2009 || Catalina || CSS || — || align=right data-sort-value="0.97" | 970 m || 
|-id=646 bgcolor=#E9E9E9
| 362646 ||  || — || December 4, 2007 || Kitt Peak || Spacewatch || — || align=right | 2.0 km || 
|-id=647 bgcolor=#E9E9E9
| 362647 ||  || — || April 22, 2009 || Mount Lemmon || Mount Lemmon Survey || JUN || align=right | 1.4 km || 
|-id=648 bgcolor=#E9E9E9
| 362648 ||  || — || January 17, 2004 || Palomar || NEAT || — || align=right | 1.6 km || 
|-id=649 bgcolor=#d6d6d6
| 362649 ||  || — || August 30, 2005 || Palomar || NEAT || — || align=right | 3.9 km || 
|-id=650 bgcolor=#fefefe
| 362650 ||  || — || September 16, 2004 || Kitt Peak || Spacewatch || NYS || align=right data-sort-value="0.75" | 750 m || 
|-id=651 bgcolor=#FA8072
| 362651 ||  || — || October 29, 2006 || Mount Lemmon || Mount Lemmon Survey || H || align=right data-sort-value="0.83" | 830 m || 
|-id=652 bgcolor=#fefefe
| 362652 ||  || — || September 14, 2007 || Socorro || LINEAR || — || align=right | 1.0 km || 
|-id=653 bgcolor=#E9E9E9
| 362653 ||  || — || January 24, 2004 || Socorro || LINEAR || — || align=right | 1.4 km || 
|-id=654 bgcolor=#E9E9E9
| 362654 ||  || — || September 18, 2006 || Catalina || CSS || — || align=right | 3.2 km || 
|-id=655 bgcolor=#fefefe
| 362655 ||  || — || October 4, 2004 || Kitt Peak || Spacewatch || NYS || align=right data-sort-value="0.63" | 630 m || 
|-id=656 bgcolor=#E9E9E9
| 362656 ||  || — || February 19, 2009 || Kitt Peak || Spacewatch || — || align=right | 1.4 km || 
|-id=657 bgcolor=#E9E9E9
| 362657 ||  || — || October 5, 2007 || Kitt Peak || Spacewatch || — || align=right data-sort-value="0.91" | 910 m || 
|-id=658 bgcolor=#E9E9E9
| 362658 ||  || — || October 31, 2002 || Socorro || LINEAR || — || align=right | 2.2 km || 
|-id=659 bgcolor=#E9E9E9
| 362659 ||  || — || September 15, 2007 || Mount Lemmon || Mount Lemmon Survey || — || align=right | 1.3 km || 
|-id=660 bgcolor=#fefefe
| 362660 ||  || — || February 22, 2006 || Kitt Peak || Spacewatch || — || align=right data-sort-value="0.82" | 820 m || 
|-id=661 bgcolor=#E9E9E9
| 362661 ||  || — || April 20, 2009 || Mount Lemmon || Mount Lemmon Survey || — || align=right | 1.4 km || 
|-id=662 bgcolor=#d6d6d6
| 362662 ||  || — || April 13, 2002 || Palomar || NEAT || — || align=right | 3.5 km || 
|-id=663 bgcolor=#E9E9E9
| 362663 ||  || — || December 6, 2007 || Mount Lemmon || Mount Lemmon Survey || — || align=right data-sort-value="0.79" | 790 m || 
|-id=664 bgcolor=#fefefe
| 362664 ||  || — || December 19, 2004 || Kitt Peak || Spacewatch || — || align=right data-sort-value="0.79" | 790 m || 
|-id=665 bgcolor=#fefefe
| 362665 ||  || — || April 24, 2006 || Kitt Peak || Spacewatch || — || align=right data-sort-value="0.98" | 980 m || 
|-id=666 bgcolor=#fefefe
| 362666 ||  || — || October 15, 2001 || Kitt Peak || Spacewatch || — || align=right data-sort-value="0.75" | 750 m || 
|-id=667 bgcolor=#E9E9E9
| 362667 ||  || — || October 25, 2003 || Kitt Peak || Spacewatch || — || align=right | 1.2 km || 
|-id=668 bgcolor=#fefefe
| 362668 ||  || — || October 4, 2004 || Kitt Peak || Spacewatch || — || align=right data-sort-value="0.98" | 980 m || 
|-id=669 bgcolor=#fefefe
| 362669 ||  || — || September 11, 2007 || Mount Lemmon || Mount Lemmon Survey || CLA || align=right | 1.6 km || 
|-id=670 bgcolor=#fefefe
| 362670 ||  || — || January 30, 2009 || Mount Lemmon || Mount Lemmon Survey || V || align=right data-sort-value="0.70" | 700 m || 
|-id=671 bgcolor=#fefefe
| 362671 ||  || — || October 9, 2004 || Kitt Peak || Spacewatch || — || align=right | 1.1 km || 
|-id=672 bgcolor=#fefefe
| 362672 ||  || — || May 21, 2006 || Kitt Peak || Spacewatch || — || align=right data-sort-value="0.69" | 690 m || 
|-id=673 bgcolor=#fefefe
| 362673 ||  || — || August 23, 2007 || Kitt Peak || Spacewatch || NYS || align=right data-sort-value="0.70" | 700 m || 
|-id=674 bgcolor=#E9E9E9
| 362674 ||  || — || October 18, 2011 || Kitt Peak || Spacewatch || — || align=right | 1.7 km || 
|-id=675 bgcolor=#E9E9E9
| 362675 ||  || — || October 10, 2002 || Apache Point || SDSS || — || align=right | 1.2 km || 
|-id=676 bgcolor=#E9E9E9
| 362676 ||  || — || October 10, 2002 || Palomar || NEAT || — || align=right | 1.9 km || 
|-id=677 bgcolor=#E9E9E9
| 362677 ||  || — || October 21, 2007 || Mount Lemmon || Mount Lemmon Survey || — || align=right | 1.0 km || 
|-id=678 bgcolor=#E9E9E9
| 362678 ||  || — || March 17, 2004 || Kitt Peak || Spacewatch || ADE || align=right | 2.3 km || 
|-id=679 bgcolor=#fefefe
| 362679 ||  || — || October 6, 2000 || Anderson Mesa || LONEOS || — || align=right data-sort-value="0.91" | 910 m || 
|-id=680 bgcolor=#d6d6d6
| 362680 ||  || — || September 26, 2005 || Catalina || CSS || — || align=right | 4.4 km || 
|-id=681 bgcolor=#E9E9E9
| 362681 ||  || — || September 26, 2006 || Kitt Peak || Spacewatch || — || align=right | 2.1 km || 
|-id=682 bgcolor=#fefefe
| 362682 ||  || — || November 3, 2004 || Palomar || NEAT || — || align=right | 1.7 km || 
|-id=683 bgcolor=#fefefe
| 362683 ||  || — || May 1, 2006 || Mauna Kea || P. A. Wiegert || V || align=right data-sort-value="0.62" | 620 m || 
|-id=684 bgcolor=#fefefe
| 362684 ||  || — || October 10, 2007 || Kitt Peak || Spacewatch || V || align=right data-sort-value="0.80" | 800 m || 
|-id=685 bgcolor=#fefefe
| 362685 ||  || — || September 4, 2007 || Mount Lemmon || Mount Lemmon Survey || V || align=right data-sort-value="0.60" | 600 m || 
|-id=686 bgcolor=#fefefe
| 362686 ||  || — || April 22, 2002 || Kitt Peak || Spacewatch || — || align=right | 1.1 km || 
|-id=687 bgcolor=#fefefe
| 362687 ||  || — || September 9, 2007 || Kitt Peak || Spacewatch || — || align=right data-sort-value="0.92" | 920 m || 
|-id=688 bgcolor=#E9E9E9
| 362688 ||  || — || April 18, 2009 || Mount Lemmon || Mount Lemmon Survey || — || align=right | 2.2 km || 
|-id=689 bgcolor=#E9E9E9
| 362689 ||  || — || April 16, 2005 || Kitt Peak || Spacewatch || — || align=right | 1.1 km || 
|-id=690 bgcolor=#fefefe
| 362690 ||  || — || April 15, 2010 || Mount Lemmon || Mount Lemmon Survey || — || align=right data-sort-value="0.73" | 730 m || 
|-id=691 bgcolor=#E9E9E9
| 362691 ||  || — || October 8, 2007 || Kitt Peak || Spacewatch || KON || align=right | 2.1 km || 
|-id=692 bgcolor=#fefefe
| 362692 ||  || — || October 9, 2004 || Kitt Peak || Spacewatch || V || align=right data-sort-value="0.69" | 690 m || 
|-id=693 bgcolor=#fefefe
| 362693 ||  || — || July 24, 2000 || Kitt Peak || Spacewatch || — || align=right data-sort-value="0.94" | 940 m || 
|-id=694 bgcolor=#fefefe
| 362694 ||  || — || September 22, 2003 || Kitt Peak || Spacewatch || — || align=right data-sort-value="0.89" | 890 m || 
|-id=695 bgcolor=#E9E9E9
| 362695 ||  || — || December 30, 2007 || Mount Lemmon || Mount Lemmon Survey || — || align=right | 2.3 km || 
|-id=696 bgcolor=#fefefe
| 362696 ||  || — || February 1, 2009 || Mount Lemmon || Mount Lemmon Survey || V || align=right data-sort-value="0.73" | 730 m || 
|-id=697 bgcolor=#fefefe
| 362697 ||  || — || June 1, 1997 || Prescott || P. G. Comba || FLO || align=right data-sort-value="0.70" | 700 m || 
|-id=698 bgcolor=#d6d6d6
| 362698 ||  || — || May 14, 2008 || Mount Lemmon || Mount Lemmon Survey || — || align=right | 3.4 km || 
|-id=699 bgcolor=#fefefe
| 362699 ||  || — || April 19, 1996 || Kitt Peak || Spacewatch || V || align=right data-sort-value="0.77" | 770 m || 
|-id=700 bgcolor=#fefefe
| 362700 ||  || — || December 3, 2004 || Nashville || R. Clingan || FLO || align=right data-sort-value="0.71" | 710 m || 
|}

362701–362800 

|-bgcolor=#E9E9E9
| 362701 ||  || — || September 19, 2006 || Siding Spring || SSS || GAL || align=right | 2.1 km || 
|-id=702 bgcolor=#fefefe
| 362702 ||  || — || December 10, 2005 || Kitt Peak || Spacewatch || — || align=right data-sort-value="0.79" | 790 m || 
|-id=703 bgcolor=#E9E9E9
| 362703 ||  || — || August 19, 2006 || Kitt Peak || Spacewatch || — || align=right | 1.4 km || 
|-id=704 bgcolor=#E9E9E9
| 362704 ||  || — || November 2, 2007 || Kitt Peak || Spacewatch || — || align=right | 1.1 km || 
|-id=705 bgcolor=#d6d6d6
| 362705 ||  || — || November 15, 1995 || Kitt Peak || Spacewatch || — || align=right | 3.4 km || 
|-id=706 bgcolor=#E9E9E9
| 362706 ||  || — || October 3, 2002 || Palomar || NEAT || AER || align=right | 1.8 km || 
|-id=707 bgcolor=#fefefe
| 362707 ||  || — || December 22, 2005 || Kitt Peak || Spacewatch || FLO || align=right data-sort-value="0.62" | 620 m || 
|-id=708 bgcolor=#fefefe
| 362708 ||  || — || October 13, 2001 || Anderson Mesa || LONEOS || — || align=right | 1.2 km || 
|-id=709 bgcolor=#E9E9E9
| 362709 ||  || — || April 16, 2004 || Kitt Peak || Spacewatch || — || align=right | 3.0 km || 
|-id=710 bgcolor=#fefefe
| 362710 ||  || — || September 4, 2007 || Catalina || CSS || — || align=right | 1.1 km || 
|-id=711 bgcolor=#E9E9E9
| 362711 ||  || — || December 4, 2007 || Kitt Peak || Spacewatch || — || align=right | 1.6 km || 
|-id=712 bgcolor=#E9E9E9
| 362712 ||  || — || December 6, 2007 || Kitt Peak || Spacewatch || — || align=right | 1.1 km || 
|-id=713 bgcolor=#d6d6d6
| 362713 ||  || — || November 1, 2000 || Kitt Peak || Spacewatch || 637 || align=right | 2.0 km || 
|-id=714 bgcolor=#E9E9E9
| 362714 ||  || — || December 19, 2007 || Mount Lemmon || Mount Lemmon Survey || — || align=right | 1.4 km || 
|-id=715 bgcolor=#d6d6d6
| 362715 ||  || — || February 28, 2008 || Kitt Peak || Spacewatch || — || align=right | 3.2 km || 
|-id=716 bgcolor=#E9E9E9
| 362716 ||  || — || February 5, 1995 || Kitt Peak || Spacewatch || VIB || align=right | 1.6 km || 
|-id=717 bgcolor=#E9E9E9
| 362717 ||  || — || November 2, 2007 || Kitt Peak || Spacewatch || — || align=right | 1.0 km || 
|-id=718 bgcolor=#E9E9E9
| 362718 ||  || — || April 29, 2009 || Siding Spring || SSS || EUN || align=right | 1.7 km || 
|-id=719 bgcolor=#fefefe
| 362719 ||  || — || September 23, 2000 || Socorro || LINEAR || — || align=right | 1.2 km || 
|-id=720 bgcolor=#E9E9E9
| 362720 ||  || — || November 5, 2007 || Mount Lemmon || Mount Lemmon Survey || — || align=right data-sort-value="0.86" | 860 m || 
|-id=721 bgcolor=#E9E9E9
| 362721 ||  || — || May 4, 2005 || Mount Lemmon || Mount Lemmon Survey || HNS || align=right | 1.2 km || 
|-id=722 bgcolor=#E9E9E9
| 362722 ||  || — || September 26, 2006 || Kitt Peak || Spacewatch || — || align=right | 1.7 km || 
|-id=723 bgcolor=#fefefe
| 362723 ||  || — || September 26, 2003 || Apache Point || SDSS || NYS || align=right data-sort-value="0.70" | 700 m || 
|-id=724 bgcolor=#E9E9E9
| 362724 ||  || — || December 8, 1998 || Kitt Peak || Spacewatch || — || align=right | 1.6 km || 
|-id=725 bgcolor=#d6d6d6
| 362725 ||  || — || August 29, 2005 || Kitt Peak || Spacewatch || — || align=right | 2.7 km || 
|-id=726 bgcolor=#E9E9E9
| 362726 ||  || — || November 13, 2002 || Palomar || NEAT || — || align=right | 2.2 km || 
|-id=727 bgcolor=#E9E9E9
| 362727 ||  || — || December 17, 2007 || Mount Lemmon || Mount Lemmon Survey || — || align=right | 1.7 km || 
|-id=728 bgcolor=#fefefe
| 362728 ||  || — || November 19, 2003 || Kitt Peak || Spacewatch || H || align=right data-sort-value="0.77" | 770 m || 
|-id=729 bgcolor=#fefefe
| 362729 ||  || — || September 13, 2007 || Mount Lemmon || Mount Lemmon Survey || V || align=right data-sort-value="0.66" | 660 m || 
|-id=730 bgcolor=#E9E9E9
| 362730 ||  || — || December 18, 2003 || Kitt Peak || Spacewatch || — || align=right | 1.6 km || 
|-id=731 bgcolor=#fefefe
| 362731 ||  || — || October 12, 2007 || Mount Lemmon || Mount Lemmon Survey || — || align=right | 1.1 km || 
|-id=732 bgcolor=#E9E9E9
| 362732 ||  || — || November 6, 2007 || Mount Lemmon || Mount Lemmon Survey || WIT || align=right | 1.2 km || 
|-id=733 bgcolor=#E9E9E9
| 362733 ||  || — || March 24, 2009 || Kitt Peak || Spacewatch || — || align=right | 1.6 km || 
|-id=734 bgcolor=#fefefe
| 362734 ||  || — || October 24, 1993 || Kitt Peak || Spacewatch || V || align=right data-sort-value="0.60" | 600 m || 
|-id=735 bgcolor=#fefefe
| 362735 ||  || — || November 24, 2008 || Mount Lemmon || Mount Lemmon Survey || — || align=right data-sort-value="0.82" | 820 m || 
|-id=736 bgcolor=#E9E9E9
| 362736 ||  || — || April 3, 2000 || Kitt Peak || Spacewatch || — || align=right | 1.2 km || 
|-id=737 bgcolor=#E9E9E9
| 362737 ||  || — || October 21, 2007 || Mount Lemmon || Mount Lemmon Survey || — || align=right data-sort-value="0.75" | 750 m || 
|-id=738 bgcolor=#E9E9E9
| 362738 ||  || — || January 31, 2009 || Kitt Peak || Spacewatch || KON || align=right | 2.7 km || 
|-id=739 bgcolor=#E9E9E9
| 362739 ||  || — || November 19, 2003 || Socorro || LINEAR || — || align=right | 1.3 km || 
|-id=740 bgcolor=#E9E9E9
| 362740 ||  || — || December 4, 2007 || Kitt Peak || Spacewatch || MIS || align=right | 2.6 km || 
|-id=741 bgcolor=#E9E9E9
| 362741 ||  || — || May 4, 2005 || Kitt Peak || Spacewatch || EUN || align=right | 1.2 km || 
|-id=742 bgcolor=#E9E9E9
| 362742 ||  || — || January 21, 2008 || Mount Lemmon || Mount Lemmon Survey || GEF || align=right | 1.2 km || 
|-id=743 bgcolor=#fefefe
| 362743 ||  || — || January 15, 2005 || Kitt Peak || Spacewatch || MAS || align=right data-sort-value="0.66" | 660 m || 
|-id=744 bgcolor=#fefefe
| 362744 ||  || — || October 30, 2008 || Mount Lemmon || Mount Lemmon Survey || — || align=right data-sort-value="0.89" | 890 m || 
|-id=745 bgcolor=#fefefe
| 362745 ||  || — || April 2, 2006 || Kitt Peak || Spacewatch || V || align=right data-sort-value="0.74" | 740 m || 
|-id=746 bgcolor=#fefefe
| 362746 ||  || — || March 23, 2006 || Kitt Peak || Spacewatch || — || align=right data-sort-value="0.76" | 760 m || 
|-id=747 bgcolor=#fefefe
| 362747 ||  || — || August 26, 2000 || Kitt Peak || Spacewatch || — || align=right data-sort-value="0.94" | 940 m || 
|-id=748 bgcolor=#E9E9E9
| 362748 ||  || — || October 12, 2007 || Socorro || LINEAR || HNS || align=right | 1.3 km || 
|-id=749 bgcolor=#fefefe
| 362749 ||  || — || January 15, 2009 || Kitt Peak || Spacewatch || — || align=right data-sort-value="0.79" | 790 m || 
|-id=750 bgcolor=#fefefe
| 362750 ||  || — || September 27, 2000 || Kitt Peak || Spacewatch || V || align=right data-sort-value="0.74" | 740 m || 
|-id=751 bgcolor=#fefefe
| 362751 ||  || — || June 21, 2007 || Mount Lemmon || Mount Lemmon Survey || V || align=right data-sort-value="0.63" | 630 m || 
|-id=752 bgcolor=#d6d6d6
| 362752 ||  || — || April 10, 2002 || Socorro || LINEAR || EUP || align=right | 4.2 km || 
|-id=753 bgcolor=#fefefe
| 362753 ||  || — || February 20, 2009 || Catalina || CSS || V || align=right data-sort-value="0.77" | 770 m || 
|-id=754 bgcolor=#E9E9E9
| 362754 ||  || — || September 25, 2006 || Mount Lemmon || Mount Lemmon Survey || — || align=right | 2.6 km || 
|-id=755 bgcolor=#E9E9E9
| 362755 ||  || — || September 14, 2002 || Palomar || NEAT || — || align=right | 1.5 km || 
|-id=756 bgcolor=#fefefe
| 362756 ||  || — || September 11, 2007 || Catalina || CSS || V || align=right data-sort-value="0.82" | 820 m || 
|-id=757 bgcolor=#E9E9E9
| 362757 ||  || — || December 15, 2003 || Socorro || LINEAR || ADE || align=right | 2.1 km || 
|-id=758 bgcolor=#fefefe
| 362758 ||  || — || January 24, 1996 || Kitt Peak || Spacewatch || FLO || align=right data-sort-value="0.64" | 640 m || 
|-id=759 bgcolor=#d6d6d6
| 362759 ||  || — || May 3, 1997 || Kitt Peak || Spacewatch || EUP || align=right | 4.1 km || 
|-id=760 bgcolor=#d6d6d6
| 362760 ||  || — || October 28, 2011 || Mount Lemmon || Mount Lemmon Survey || — || align=right | 4.4 km || 
|-id=761 bgcolor=#fefefe
| 362761 ||  || — || August 10, 2007 || Kitt Peak || Spacewatch || V || align=right data-sort-value="0.75" | 750 m || 
|-id=762 bgcolor=#d6d6d6
| 362762 ||  || — || September 14, 2005 || Kitt Peak || Spacewatch || — || align=right | 3.1 km || 
|-id=763 bgcolor=#E9E9E9
| 362763 ||  || — || March 24, 2009 || Mount Lemmon || Mount Lemmon Survey || BRU || align=right | 2.4 km || 
|-id=764 bgcolor=#E9E9E9
| 362764 ||  || — || March 19, 2009 || Kitt Peak || Spacewatch || — || align=right | 1.8 km || 
|-id=765 bgcolor=#fefefe
| 362765 ||  || — || January 25, 2009 || Catalina || CSS || — || align=right | 1.6 km || 
|-id=766 bgcolor=#E9E9E9
| 362766 ||  || — || December 18, 2007 || Mount Lemmon || Mount Lemmon Survey || — || align=right | 1.4 km || 
|-id=767 bgcolor=#fefefe
| 362767 ||  || — || March 10, 2005 || Mount Lemmon || Mount Lemmon Survey || MAS || align=right data-sort-value="0.74" | 740 m || 
|-id=768 bgcolor=#E9E9E9
| 362768 ||  || — || May 28, 2009 || Mount Lemmon || Mount Lemmon Survey || — || align=right | 1.6 km || 
|-id=769 bgcolor=#fefefe
| 362769 ||  || — || May 31, 2006 || Mount Lemmon || Mount Lemmon Survey || — || align=right | 1.1 km || 
|-id=770 bgcolor=#fefefe
| 362770 ||  || — || March 25, 2006 || Kitt Peak || Spacewatch || NYS || align=right data-sort-value="0.73" | 730 m || 
|-id=771 bgcolor=#E9E9E9
| 362771 ||  || — || April 11, 2005 || Mount Lemmon || Mount Lemmon Survey || — || align=right | 1.1 km || 
|-id=772 bgcolor=#E9E9E9
| 362772 ||  || — || October 3, 2006 || Mount Lemmon || Mount Lemmon Survey || MRX || align=right | 1.1 km || 
|-id=773 bgcolor=#E9E9E9
| 362773 ||  || — || October 11, 2006 || Kitt Peak || Spacewatch || HOF || align=right | 2.7 km || 
|-id=774 bgcolor=#E9E9E9
| 362774 ||  || — || January 12, 1996 || Kitt Peak || Spacewatch || — || align=right | 1.0 km || 
|-id=775 bgcolor=#fefefe
| 362775 ||  || — || December 8, 2004 || Socorro || LINEAR || FLO || align=right data-sort-value="0.83" | 830 m || 
|-id=776 bgcolor=#E9E9E9
| 362776 ||  || — || April 9, 2005 || Kitt Peak || Spacewatch || — || align=right | 1.1 km || 
|-id=777 bgcolor=#d6d6d6
| 362777 ||  || — || September 12, 2005 || Kitt Peak || Spacewatch || — || align=right | 2.7 km || 
|-id=778 bgcolor=#d6d6d6
| 362778 ||  || — || July 30, 2010 || WISE || WISE || — || align=right | 3.1 km || 
|-id=779 bgcolor=#fefefe
| 362779 ||  || — || March 26, 2003 || Kitt Peak || Spacewatch || — || align=right data-sort-value="0.71" | 710 m || 
|-id=780 bgcolor=#E9E9E9
| 362780 ||  || — || December 19, 2003 || Socorro || LINEAR || — || align=right | 1.2 km || 
|-id=781 bgcolor=#E9E9E9
| 362781 ||  || — || April 13, 2004 || Kitt Peak || Spacewatch || GEF || align=right | 1.3 km || 
|-id=782 bgcolor=#E9E9E9
| 362782 ||  || — || April 21, 2004 || Kitt Peak || Spacewatch || — || align=right | 3.3 km || 
|-id=783 bgcolor=#E9E9E9
| 362783 ||  || — || January 16, 2004 || Palomar || NEAT || EUN || align=right | 1.6 km || 
|-id=784 bgcolor=#fefefe
| 362784 ||  || — || October 23, 2003 || Kitt Peak || Spacewatch || — || align=right data-sort-value="0.99" | 990 m || 
|-id=785 bgcolor=#d6d6d6
| 362785 ||  || — || November 22, 2006 || Catalina || CSS || TRP || align=right | 3.1 km || 
|-id=786 bgcolor=#fefefe
| 362786 ||  || — || April 15, 2010 || WISE || WISE || — || align=right | 3.1 km || 
|-id=787 bgcolor=#E9E9E9
| 362787 ||  || — || December 20, 2007 || Kitt Peak || Spacewatch || — || align=right | 1.3 km || 
|-id=788 bgcolor=#fefefe
| 362788 ||  || — || October 10, 2004 || Kitt Peak || Spacewatch || V || align=right data-sort-value="0.65" | 650 m || 
|-id=789 bgcolor=#E9E9E9
| 362789 ||  || — || March 12, 2005 || Mount Lemmon || Mount Lemmon Survey || — || align=right | 1.2 km || 
|-id=790 bgcolor=#E9E9E9
| 362790 ||  || — || March 21, 2009 || Kitt Peak || Spacewatch || — || align=right | 2.1 km || 
|-id=791 bgcolor=#fefefe
| 362791 ||  || — || May 11, 2010 || Mount Lemmon || Mount Lemmon Survey || — || align=right data-sort-value="0.69" | 690 m || 
|-id=792 bgcolor=#E9E9E9
| 362792 ||  || — || November 24, 2003 || Kitt Peak || Spacewatch || — || align=right data-sort-value="0.97" | 970 m || 
|-id=793 bgcolor=#E9E9E9
| 362793 Suetolson ||  ||  || August 23, 2006 || Mauna Kea || D. D. Balam || — || align=right | 2.6 km || 
|-id=794 bgcolor=#E9E9E9
| 362794 ||  || — || February 17, 2004 || Catalina || CSS || — || align=right | 3.7 km || 
|-id=795 bgcolor=#d6d6d6
| 362795 ||  || — || December 13, 2006 || Kitt Peak || Spacewatch || BRA || align=right | 2.9 km || 
|-id=796 bgcolor=#E9E9E9
| 362796 ||  || — || October 9, 2007 || Mount Lemmon || Mount Lemmon Survey || HNS || align=right | 1.5 km || 
|-id=797 bgcolor=#fefefe
| 362797 ||  || — || December 5, 2008 || Mount Lemmon || Mount Lemmon Survey || — || align=right data-sort-value="0.85" | 850 m || 
|-id=798 bgcolor=#E9E9E9
| 362798 ||  || — || January 22, 2004 || Palomar || NEAT || EUN || align=right | 1.4 km || 
|-id=799 bgcolor=#E9E9E9
| 362799 ||  || — || September 19, 2006 || Siding Spring || SSS || BRU || align=right | 4.0 km || 
|-id=800 bgcolor=#E9E9E9
| 362800 ||  || — || October 2, 2006 || Mount Lemmon || Mount Lemmon Survey || HNA || align=right | 2.2 km || 
|}

362801–362900 

|-bgcolor=#E9E9E9
| 362801 ||  || — || November 21, 1995 || Kitt Peak || Spacewatch || — || align=right | 1.1 km || 
|-id=802 bgcolor=#d6d6d6
| 362802 ||  || — || December 8, 2005 || Catalina || CSS || ALA || align=right | 6.3 km || 
|-id=803 bgcolor=#E9E9E9
| 362803 ||  || — || November 8, 2007 || Mount Lemmon || Mount Lemmon Survey || — || align=right | 1.2 km || 
|-id=804 bgcolor=#d6d6d6
| 362804 ||  || — || February 2, 2008 || Kitt Peak || Spacewatch || CHA || align=right | 2.3 km || 
|-id=805 bgcolor=#d6d6d6
| 362805 ||  || — || December 2, 1999 || Ondřejov || Ondřejov Obs. || HYG || align=right | 4.0 km || 
|-id=806 bgcolor=#d6d6d6
| 362806 ||  || — || November 6, 2005 || Kitt Peak || Spacewatch || — || align=right | 3.0 km || 
|-id=807 bgcolor=#d6d6d6
| 362807 ||  || — || October 25, 2005 || Mount Lemmon || Mount Lemmon Survey || THM || align=right | 2.1 km || 
|-id=808 bgcolor=#E9E9E9
| 362808 ||  || — || November 18, 2006 || Kitt Peak || Spacewatch || — || align=right | 3.1 km || 
|-id=809 bgcolor=#d6d6d6
| 362809 ||  || — || June 28, 2010 || WISE || WISE || HYG || align=right | 3.1 km || 
|-id=810 bgcolor=#d6d6d6
| 362810 ||  || — || December 5, 2005 || Kitt Peak || Spacewatch || fast? || align=right | 3.5 km || 
|-id=811 bgcolor=#d6d6d6
| 362811 ||  || — || December 11, 2006 || Kitt Peak || Spacewatch || CHA || align=right | 2.4 km || 
|-id=812 bgcolor=#d6d6d6
| 362812 ||  || — || May 4, 2002 || Palomar || NEAT || — || align=right | 3.5 km || 
|-id=813 bgcolor=#E9E9E9
| 362813 ||  || — || October 18, 2006 || Kitt Peak || Spacewatch || WIT || align=right | 1.1 km || 
|-id=814 bgcolor=#E9E9E9
| 362814 ||  || — || November 16, 2006 || Kitt Peak || Spacewatch || — || align=right | 2.8 km || 
|-id=815 bgcolor=#E9E9E9
| 362815 ||  || — || May 29, 2006 || Jarnac || Jarnac Obs. || — || align=right | 1.5 km || 
|-id=816 bgcolor=#d6d6d6
| 362816 ||  || — || February 25, 2007 || Mount Lemmon || Mount Lemmon Survey || THM || align=right | 2.5 km || 
|-id=817 bgcolor=#E9E9E9
| 362817 ||  || — || November 16, 1998 || Kitt Peak || Spacewatch || — || align=right | 1.9 km || 
|-id=818 bgcolor=#d6d6d6
| 362818 ||  || — || August 7, 2010 || WISE || WISE || VER || align=right | 4.4 km || 
|-id=819 bgcolor=#d6d6d6
| 362819 ||  || — || April 14, 2007 || Catalina || CSS || — || align=right | 4.5 km || 
|-id=820 bgcolor=#d6d6d6
| 362820 ||  || — || December 25, 2005 || Kitt Peak || Spacewatch || HYG || align=right | 2.9 km || 
|-id=821 bgcolor=#d6d6d6
| 362821 ||  || — || March 11, 2003 || Kitt Peak || Spacewatch || KOR || align=right | 1.8 km || 
|-id=822 bgcolor=#fefefe
| 362822 ||  || — || April 21, 2006 || Kitt Peak || Spacewatch || V || align=right data-sort-value="0.67" | 670 m || 
|-id=823 bgcolor=#d6d6d6
| 362823 ||  || — || November 6, 2005 || Mount Lemmon || Mount Lemmon Survey || — || align=right | 3.0 km || 
|-id=824 bgcolor=#E9E9E9
| 362824 ||  || — || March 10, 2003 || Palomar || NEAT || — || align=right | 2.8 km || 
|-id=825 bgcolor=#d6d6d6
| 362825 ||  || — || November 1, 2005 || Mount Lemmon || Mount Lemmon Survey || — || align=right | 3.9 km || 
|-id=826 bgcolor=#E9E9E9
| 362826 ||  || — || November 24, 2006 || Kitt Peak || Spacewatch || — || align=right | 2.7 km || 
|-id=827 bgcolor=#E9E9E9
| 362827 ||  || — || February 11, 2008 || Mount Lemmon || Mount Lemmon Survey || — || align=right | 3.0 km || 
|-id=828 bgcolor=#d6d6d6
| 362828 ||  || — || April 21, 2002 || Palomar || NEAT || URS || align=right | 4.0 km || 
|-id=829 bgcolor=#d6d6d6
| 362829 ||  || — || November 24, 2006 || Mount Lemmon || Mount Lemmon Survey || URS || align=right | 5.1 km || 
|-id=830 bgcolor=#d6d6d6
| 362830 ||  || — || November 3, 2005 || Mount Lemmon || Mount Lemmon Survey || HYG || align=right | 2.9 km || 
|-id=831 bgcolor=#d6d6d6
| 362831 ||  || — || December 29, 2005 || Socorro || LINEAR || — || align=right | 4.9 km || 
|-id=832 bgcolor=#E9E9E9
| 362832 ||  || — || March 25, 2003 || Palomar || NEAT || GEF || align=right | 1.8 km || 
|-id=833 bgcolor=#E9E9E9
| 362833 ||  || — || November 15, 2006 || Mount Lemmon || Mount Lemmon Survey || — || align=right | 2.2 km || 
|-id=834 bgcolor=#d6d6d6
| 362834 ||  || — || February 17, 2007 || Kitt Peak || Spacewatch || — || align=right | 3.8 km || 
|-id=835 bgcolor=#E9E9E9
| 362835 ||  || — || July 30, 2005 || Palomar || NEAT || PAD || align=right | 2.8 km || 
|-id=836 bgcolor=#d6d6d6
| 362836 ||  || — || December 1, 2006 || Mount Lemmon || Mount Lemmon Survey || — || align=right | 3.4 km || 
|-id=837 bgcolor=#d6d6d6
| 362837 ||  || — || January 27, 2007 || Catalina || CSS || — || align=right | 4.8 km || 
|-id=838 bgcolor=#d6d6d6
| 362838 ||  || — || July 15, 2010 || WISE || WISE || ALA || align=right | 6.3 km || 
|-id=839 bgcolor=#d6d6d6
| 362839 ||  || — || August 18, 2009 || Kitt Peak || Spacewatch || — || align=right | 4.1 km || 
|-id=840 bgcolor=#fefefe
| 362840 ||  || — || November 1, 1999 || Kitt Peak || Spacewatch || NYS || align=right data-sort-value="0.83" | 830 m || 
|-id=841 bgcolor=#E9E9E9
| 362841 ||  || — || March 13, 2003 || Kitt Peak || Spacewatch || — || align=right | 2.5 km || 
|-id=842 bgcolor=#d6d6d6
| 362842 ||  || — || October 11, 2010 || Mount Lemmon || Mount Lemmon Survey || — || align=right | 3.6 km || 
|-id=843 bgcolor=#d6d6d6
| 362843 ||  || — || November 30, 2005 || Kitt Peak || Spacewatch || URS || align=right | 4.5 km || 
|-id=844 bgcolor=#d6d6d6
| 362844 ||  || — || January 14, 2007 || Lulin || Lulin Obs. || EOS || align=right | 2.4 km || 
|-id=845 bgcolor=#E9E9E9
| 362845 ||  || — || August 31, 2005 || Kitt Peak || Spacewatch || HOF || align=right | 2.9 km || 
|-id=846 bgcolor=#E9E9E9
| 362846 ||  || — || January 26, 2003 || Anderson Mesa || LONEOS || — || align=right | 3.4 km || 
|-id=847 bgcolor=#E9E9E9
| 362847 ||  || — || August 6, 2010 || WISE || WISE || — || align=right | 3.0 km || 
|-id=848 bgcolor=#d6d6d6
| 362848 ||  || — || April 12, 2002 || Palomar || NEAT || — || align=right | 3.8 km || 
|-id=849 bgcolor=#E9E9E9
| 362849 ||  || — || November 19, 2006 || Catalina || CSS || — || align=right | 3.0 km || 
|-id=850 bgcolor=#d6d6d6
| 362850 ||  || — || March 11, 2007 || Kitt Peak || Spacewatch || — || align=right | 2.9 km || 
|-id=851 bgcolor=#d6d6d6
| 362851 ||  || — || July 27, 2009 || Kitt Peak || Spacewatch || — || align=right | 3.5 km || 
|-id=852 bgcolor=#d6d6d6
| 362852 ||  || — || February 23, 2007 || Catalina || CSS || EOS || align=right | 2.4 km || 
|-id=853 bgcolor=#d6d6d6
| 362853 ||  || — || April 21, 2003 || Kitt Peak || Spacewatch || — || align=right | 3.0 km || 
|-id=854 bgcolor=#d6d6d6
| 362854 ||  || — || April 10, 2002 || Palomar || NEAT || URS || align=right | 4.6 km || 
|-id=855 bgcolor=#d6d6d6
| 362855 ||  || — || October 27, 2005 || Kitt Peak || Spacewatch || — || align=right | 2.4 km || 
|-id=856 bgcolor=#d6d6d6
| 362856 ||  || — || January 24, 2007 || Socorro || LINEAR || TRE || align=right | 3.7 km || 
|-id=857 bgcolor=#d6d6d6
| 362857 ||  || — || January 2, 2012 || Kitt Peak || Spacewatch || — || align=right | 3.2 km || 
|-id=858 bgcolor=#d6d6d6
| 362858 ||  || — || November 11, 2010 || Catalina || CSS || — || align=right | 4.2 km || 
|-id=859 bgcolor=#d6d6d6
| 362859 ||  || — || March 12, 2007 || Catalina || CSS || — || align=right | 4.6 km || 
|-id=860 bgcolor=#d6d6d6
| 362860 ||  || — || October 7, 2005 || Junk Bond || D. Healy || — || align=right | 2.5 km || 
|-id=861 bgcolor=#E9E9E9
| 362861 ||  || — || September 14, 2005 || Catalina || CSS || DOR || align=right | 3.4 km || 
|-id=862 bgcolor=#E9E9E9
| 362862 ||  || — || November 16, 2006 || Mount Lemmon || Mount Lemmon Survey || — || align=right | 2.8 km || 
|-id=863 bgcolor=#d6d6d6
| 362863 ||  || — || December 25, 2005 || Kitt Peak || Spacewatch || — || align=right | 3.9 km || 
|-id=864 bgcolor=#d6d6d6
| 362864 ||  || — || June 21, 2009 || Mount Lemmon || Mount Lemmon Survey || TIR || align=right | 3.8 km || 
|-id=865 bgcolor=#E9E9E9
| 362865 ||  || — || January 31, 2008 || Mount Lemmon || Mount Lemmon Survey || AGN || align=right | 1.7 km || 
|-id=866 bgcolor=#d6d6d6
| 362866 ||  || — || July 14, 2004 || Socorro || LINEAR || — || align=right | 3.6 km || 
|-id=867 bgcolor=#E9E9E9
| 362867 ||  || — || March 7, 2008 || Kitt Peak || Spacewatch || — || align=right | 2.5 km || 
|-id=868 bgcolor=#d6d6d6
| 362868 ||  || — || June 3, 2008 || Kitt Peak || Spacewatch || — || align=right | 3.5 km || 
|-id=869 bgcolor=#d6d6d6
| 362869 ||  || — || February 26, 2007 || Mount Lemmon || Mount Lemmon Survey || THM || align=right | 2.9 km || 
|-id=870 bgcolor=#E9E9E9
| 362870 ||  || — || March 28, 2008 || Mount Lemmon || Mount Lemmon Survey || HEN || align=right | 1.0 km || 
|-id=871 bgcolor=#d6d6d6
| 362871 ||  || — || November 1, 2010 || Mount Lemmon || Mount Lemmon Survey || EOS || align=right | 3.0 km || 
|-id=872 bgcolor=#d6d6d6
| 362872 ||  || — || November 5, 1999 || Kitt Peak || Spacewatch || — || align=right | 2.7 km || 
|-id=873 bgcolor=#d6d6d6
| 362873 ||  || — || October 23, 2006 || Mount Lemmon || Mount Lemmon Survey || — || align=right | 2.6 km || 
|-id=874 bgcolor=#d6d6d6
| 362874 ||  || — || June 27, 1998 || Kitt Peak || Spacewatch || — || align=right | 3.5 km || 
|-id=875 bgcolor=#d6d6d6
| 362875 ||  || — || May 5, 2008 || Mount Lemmon || Mount Lemmon Survey || EOS || align=right | 2.2 km || 
|-id=876 bgcolor=#d6d6d6
| 362876 ||  || — || March 13, 2007 || Kitt Peak || Spacewatch || — || align=right | 2.9 km || 
|-id=877 bgcolor=#d6d6d6
| 362877 ||  || — || December 31, 2005 || Kitt Peak || Spacewatch || — || align=right | 3.3 km || 
|-id=878 bgcolor=#d6d6d6
| 362878 ||  || — || March 15, 2008 || Mount Lemmon || Mount Lemmon Survey || — || align=right | 4.5 km || 
|-id=879 bgcolor=#E9E9E9
| 362879 ||  || — || November 16, 2006 || Kitt Peak || Spacewatch || — || align=right | 2.3 km || 
|-id=880 bgcolor=#d6d6d6
| 362880 ||  || — || October 17, 2010 || Mount Lemmon || Mount Lemmon Survey || — || align=right | 3.5 km || 
|-id=881 bgcolor=#d6d6d6
| 362881 ||  || — || March 9, 2007 || Kitt Peak || Spacewatch || — || align=right | 3.1 km || 
|-id=882 bgcolor=#d6d6d6
| 362882 ||  || — || November 30, 2005 || Kitt Peak || Spacewatch || EOS || align=right | 3.7 km || 
|-id=883 bgcolor=#E9E9E9
| 362883 ||  || — || April 25, 2004 || Anderson Mesa || LONEOS || GAL || align=right | 1.9 km || 
|-id=884 bgcolor=#E9E9E9
| 362884 ||  || — || December 17, 2006 || Mount Lemmon || Mount Lemmon Survey || — || align=right | 1.7 km || 
|-id=885 bgcolor=#d6d6d6
| 362885 ||  || — || October 6, 2005 || Kitt Peak || Spacewatch || KOR || align=right | 1.4 km || 
|-id=886 bgcolor=#E9E9E9
| 362886 ||  || — || July 26, 1997 || Caussols || ODAS || — || align=right | 2.9 km || 
|-id=887 bgcolor=#d6d6d6
| 362887 ||  || — || November 6, 2005 || Mount Lemmon || Mount Lemmon Survey || — || align=right | 2.4 km || 
|-id=888 bgcolor=#d6d6d6
| 362888 ||  || — || March 23, 2006 || Mount Lemmon || Mount Lemmon Survey || — || align=right | 4.0 km || 
|-id=889 bgcolor=#E9E9E9
| 362889 ||  || — || December 13, 2006 || Kitt Peak || Spacewatch || — || align=right | 2.6 km || 
|-id=890 bgcolor=#d6d6d6
| 362890 ||  || — || March 13, 2007 || Mount Lemmon || Mount Lemmon Survey || HYG || align=right | 2.9 km || 
|-id=891 bgcolor=#d6d6d6
| 362891 ||  || — || September 27, 2009 || Catalina || CSS || EOS || align=right | 3.1 km || 
|-id=892 bgcolor=#E9E9E9
| 362892 ||  || — || September 16, 2001 || Socorro || LINEAR || — || align=right | 1.7 km || 
|-id=893 bgcolor=#E9E9E9
| 362893 ||  || — || August 29, 2005 || Kitt Peak || Spacewatch || AGN || align=right | 1.4 km || 
|-id=894 bgcolor=#E9E9E9
| 362894 ||  || — || March 7, 2008 || Catalina || CSS || — || align=right | 2.7 km || 
|-id=895 bgcolor=#d6d6d6
| 362895 ||  || — || March 31, 2002 || Palomar || NEAT || 629 || align=right | 2.0 km || 
|-id=896 bgcolor=#E9E9E9
| 362896 ||  || — || October 19, 2006 || Catalina || CSS || — || align=right | 2.4 km || 
|-id=897 bgcolor=#d6d6d6
| 362897 ||  || — || October 19, 2010 || Mount Lemmon || Mount Lemmon Survey || — || align=right | 3.2 km || 
|-id=898 bgcolor=#fefefe
| 362898 ||  || — || November 9, 2007 || Catalina || CSS || — || align=right | 1.0 km || 
|-id=899 bgcolor=#d6d6d6
| 362899 ||  || — || August 8, 2010 || WISE || WISE || — || align=right | 3.9 km || 
|-id=900 bgcolor=#E9E9E9
| 362900 ||  || — || September 12, 2005 || Kitt Peak || Spacewatch || — || align=right | 2.7 km || 
|}

362901–363000 

|-bgcolor=#d6d6d6
| 362901 ||  || — || January 7, 2006 || Socorro || LINEAR || — || align=right | 3.7 km || 
|-id=902 bgcolor=#d6d6d6
| 362902 ||  || — || December 7, 2005 || Kitt Peak || Spacewatch || CRO || align=right | 3.4 km || 
|-id=903 bgcolor=#d6d6d6
| 362903 ||  || — || August 5, 2003 || Kitt Peak || Spacewatch || — || align=right | 3.4 km || 
|-id=904 bgcolor=#E9E9E9
| 362904 ||  || — || February 7, 2008 || Mount Lemmon || Mount Lemmon Survey || PAD || align=right | 1.9 km || 
|-id=905 bgcolor=#d6d6d6
| 362905 ||  || — || December 1, 2005 || Kitt Peak || Spacewatch || — || align=right | 4.4 km || 
|-id=906 bgcolor=#d6d6d6
| 362906 ||  || — || October 24, 2005 || Kitt Peak || Spacewatch || — || align=right | 3.5 km || 
|-id=907 bgcolor=#d6d6d6
| 362907 ||  || — || January 10, 2006 || Kitt Peak || Spacewatch || HYG || align=right | 3.2 km || 
|-id=908 bgcolor=#fefefe
| 362908 ||  || — || November 2, 2007 || Mount Lemmon || Mount Lemmon Survey || — || align=right | 1.2 km || 
|-id=909 bgcolor=#d6d6d6
| 362909 ||  || — || April 4, 2008 || Mount Lemmon || Mount Lemmon Survey || — || align=right | 3.0 km || 
|-id=910 bgcolor=#d6d6d6
| 362910 ||  || — || February 25, 2007 || Mount Lemmon || Mount Lemmon Survey || THM || align=right | 2.6 km || 
|-id=911 bgcolor=#d6d6d6
| 362911 Miguelhurtado ||  ||  || August 29, 2009 || La Sagra || OAM Obs. || EOS || align=right | 3.0 km || 
|-id=912 bgcolor=#d6d6d6
| 362912 ||  || — || January 17, 2007 || Palomar || NEAT || 615 || align=right | 2.0 km || 
|-id=913 bgcolor=#d6d6d6
| 362913 ||  || — || November 4, 2005 || Mount Lemmon || Mount Lemmon Survey || — || align=right | 3.5 km || 
|-id=914 bgcolor=#E9E9E9
| 362914 ||  || — || March 27, 2003 || Kitt Peak || Spacewatch || AGN || align=right | 1.5 km || 
|-id=915 bgcolor=#C2FFFF
| 362915 ||  || — || July 9, 2005 || Kitt Peak || Spacewatch || L4 || align=right | 9.3 km || 
|-id=916 bgcolor=#E9E9E9
| 362916 ||  || — || November 18, 2006 || Mount Lemmon || Mount Lemmon Survey || HOF || align=right | 2.6 km || 
|-id=917 bgcolor=#d6d6d6
| 362917 ||  || — || April 23, 2007 || Catalina || CSS || — || align=right | 3.7 km || 
|-id=918 bgcolor=#d6d6d6
| 362918 ||  || — || January 19, 2001 || Kitt Peak || Spacewatch || URS || align=right | 4.0 km || 
|-id=919 bgcolor=#d6d6d6
| 362919 ||  || — || March 19, 2002 || Anderson Mesa || LONEOS || EOS || align=right | 2.6 km || 
|-id=920 bgcolor=#d6d6d6
| 362920 ||  || — || February 6, 2006 || Mount Lemmon || Mount Lemmon Survey || — || align=right | 4.0 km || 
|-id=921 bgcolor=#d6d6d6
| 362921 ||  || — || August 6, 2010 || WISE || WISE || — || align=right | 3.6 km || 
|-id=922 bgcolor=#d6d6d6
| 362922 ||  || — || April 12, 2002 || Palomar || NEAT || — || align=right | 4.7 km || 
|-id=923 bgcolor=#d6d6d6
| 362923 ||  || — || March 11, 2007 || Kitt Peak || Spacewatch || — || align=right | 4.4 km || 
|-id=924 bgcolor=#d6d6d6
| 362924 ||  || — || May 7, 2008 || Mount Lemmon || Mount Lemmon Survey || — || align=right | 3.9 km || 
|-id=925 bgcolor=#FA8072
| 362925 ||  || — || January 6, 2012 || Haleakala || Pan-STARRS || — || align=right | 1.5 km || 
|-id=926 bgcolor=#d6d6d6
| 362926 ||  || — || August 20, 2002 || Palomar || NEAT || SYL7:4 || align=right | 5.8 km || 
|-id=927 bgcolor=#E9E9E9
| 362927 ||  || — || October 11, 2006 || Palomar || NEAT || EUN || align=right | 1.5 km || 
|-id=928 bgcolor=#d6d6d6
| 362928 ||  || — || August 18, 2009 || Kitt Peak || Spacewatch || — || align=right | 3.8 km || 
|-id=929 bgcolor=#d6d6d6
| 362929 ||  || — || November 28, 2010 || Kitt Peak || Spacewatch || — || align=right | 4.7 km || 
|-id=930 bgcolor=#d6d6d6
| 362930 ||  || — || November 4, 2005 || Kitt Peak || Spacewatch || — || align=right | 5.7 km || 
|-id=931 bgcolor=#d6d6d6
| 362931 ||  || — || March 6, 1999 || Kitt Peak || Spacewatch || SYL7:4 || align=right | 6.1 km || 
|-id=932 bgcolor=#d6d6d6
| 362932 ||  || — || September 6, 2004 || Siding Spring || SSS || — || align=right | 3.5 km || 
|-id=933 bgcolor=#d6d6d6
| 362933 ||  || — || December 30, 2000 || Kitt Peak || Spacewatch || — || align=right | 2.4 km || 
|-id=934 bgcolor=#d6d6d6
| 362934 ||  || — || February 1, 2006 || Kitt Peak || Spacewatch || EOS || align=right | 2.7 km || 
|-id=935 bgcolor=#E9E9E9
| 362935 ||  || — || September 26, 2006 || Siding Spring || SSS || — || align=right | 2.9 km || 
|-id=936 bgcolor=#E9E9E9
| 362936 ||  || — || July 22, 2007 || Siding Spring || SSS || — || align=right | 2.2 km || 
|-id=937 bgcolor=#fefefe
| 362937 ||  || — || May 8, 2006 || Mount Lemmon || Mount Lemmon Survey || H || align=right data-sort-value="0.92" | 920 m || 
|-id=938 bgcolor=#d6d6d6
| 362938 ||  || — || October 19, 2007 || Mount Lemmon || Mount Lemmon Survey || — || align=right | 5.1 km || 
|-id=939 bgcolor=#d6d6d6
| 362939 ||  || — || October 23, 2001 || Palomar || NEAT || — || align=right | 4.6 km || 
|-id=940 bgcolor=#E9E9E9
| 362940 ||  || — || August 21, 2003 || Campo Imperatore || CINEOS || — || align=right | 3.5 km || 
|-id=941 bgcolor=#d6d6d6
| 362941 ||  || — || March 16, 2004 || Siding Spring || SSS || — || align=right | 3.4 km || 
|-id=942 bgcolor=#E9E9E9
| 362942 ||  || — || February 16, 2010 || Catalina || CSS || — || align=right | 2.0 km || 
|-id=943 bgcolor=#E9E9E9
| 362943 ||  || — || February 1, 1997 || Kitt Peak || Spacewatch || — || align=right | 1.6 km || 
|-id=944 bgcolor=#fefefe
| 362944 ||  || — || September 10, 2007 || Mount Lemmon || Mount Lemmon Survey || — || align=right | 1.1 km || 
|-id=945 bgcolor=#E9E9E9
| 362945 ||  || — || December 18, 2003 || Socorro || LINEAR || — || align=right | 2.0 km || 
|-id=946 bgcolor=#fefefe
| 362946 ||  || — || March 23, 2006 || Kitt Peak || Spacewatch || MAS || align=right data-sort-value="0.63" | 630 m || 
|-id=947 bgcolor=#d6d6d6
| 362947 ||  || — || August 28, 2005 || Anderson Mesa || LONEOS || — || align=right | 5.3 km || 
|-id=948 bgcolor=#fefefe
| 362948 ||  || — || February 2, 2006 || Mount Lemmon || Mount Lemmon Survey || NYS || align=right data-sort-value="0.58" | 580 m || 
|-id=949 bgcolor=#d6d6d6
| 362949 ||  || — || February 28, 2008 || Kitt Peak || Spacewatch || — || align=right | 2.7 km || 
|-id=950 bgcolor=#fefefe
| 362950 ||  || — || November 4, 2004 || Catalina || CSS || NYS || align=right data-sort-value="0.82" | 820 m || 
|-id=951 bgcolor=#fefefe
| 362951 ||  || — || January 7, 2006 || Kitt Peak || Spacewatch || — || align=right data-sort-value="0.77" | 770 m || 
|-id=952 bgcolor=#E9E9E9
| 362952 ||  || — || August 29, 2006 || Kitt Peak || Spacewatch || GEF || align=right | 1.8 km || 
|-id=953 bgcolor=#d6d6d6
| 362953 ||  || — || November 5, 2007 || Mount Lemmon || Mount Lemmon Survey || — || align=right | 2.8 km || 
|-id=954 bgcolor=#d6d6d6
| 362954 ||  || — || September 12, 2004 || Kitt Peak || Spacewatch || MEL || align=right | 4.2 km || 
|-id=955 bgcolor=#E9E9E9
| 362955 ||  || — || December 21, 2003 || Kitt Peak || Spacewatch || — || align=right | 3.0 km || 
|-id=956 bgcolor=#fefefe
| 362956 ||  || — || September 1, 2005 || Kitt Peak || Spacewatch || — || align=right data-sort-value="0.89" | 890 m || 
|-id=957 bgcolor=#E9E9E9
| 362957 ||  || — || August 22, 2006 || Palomar || NEAT || HOF || align=right | 3.4 km || 
|-id=958 bgcolor=#d6d6d6
| 362958 ||  || — || August 5, 2005 || Palomar || NEAT || — || align=right | 3.3 km || 
|-id=959 bgcolor=#d6d6d6
| 362959 ||  || — || February 7, 2002 || Socorro || LINEAR || EOS || align=right | 2.9 km || 
|-id=960 bgcolor=#fefefe
| 362960 ||  || — || January 23, 2006 || Kitt Peak || Spacewatch || — || align=right data-sort-value="0.92" | 920 m || 
|-id=961 bgcolor=#d6d6d6
| 362961 ||  || — || October 4, 2005 || Palomar || NEAT || — || align=right | 4.3 km || 
|-id=962 bgcolor=#fefefe
| 362962 ||  || — || January 8, 2006 || Mount Lemmon || Mount Lemmon Survey || — || align=right data-sort-value="0.90" | 900 m || 
|-id=963 bgcolor=#d6d6d6
| 362963 ||  || — || February 6, 2008 || Catalina || CSS || — || align=right | 3.4 km || 
|-id=964 bgcolor=#d6d6d6
| 362964 ||  || — || May 1, 2010 || WISE || WISE || CRO || align=right | 3.8 km || 
|-id=965 bgcolor=#C2FFFF
| 362965 ||  || — || January 5, 2013 || Mount Lemmon || Mount Lemmon Survey || L4 || align=right | 9.1 km || 
|-id=966 bgcolor=#fefefe
| 362966 ||  || — || February 7, 2003 || Kitt Peak || Spacewatch || — || align=right data-sort-value="0.85" | 850 m || 
|-id=967 bgcolor=#E9E9E9
| 362967 ||  || — || January 15, 2005 || Kitt Peak || Spacewatch || EUN || align=right | 1.6 km || 
|-id=968 bgcolor=#fefefe
| 362968 ||  || — || March 5, 2006 || Kitt Peak || Spacewatch || NYS || align=right data-sort-value="0.69" | 690 m || 
|-id=969 bgcolor=#fefefe
| 362969 ||  || — || February 23, 2006 || Kitt Peak || Spacewatch || MAS || align=right data-sort-value="0.73" | 730 m || 
|-id=970 bgcolor=#d6d6d6
| 362970 ||  || — || April 27, 2003 || Anderson Mesa || LONEOS || — || align=right | 4.0 km || 
|-id=971 bgcolor=#E9E9E9
| 362971 ||  || — || March 25, 2000 || Kitt Peak || Spacewatch || — || align=right | 2.4 km || 
|-id=972 bgcolor=#d6d6d6
| 362972 ||  || — || February 8, 2008 || Mount Lemmon || Mount Lemmon Survey || — || align=right | 2.7 km || 
|-id=973 bgcolor=#fefefe
| 362973 ||  || — || May 2, 2003 || Kitt Peak || Spacewatch || — || align=right data-sort-value="0.86" | 860 m || 
|-id=974 bgcolor=#E9E9E9
| 362974 ||  || — || October 13, 2007 || Catalina || CSS || — || align=right | 1.2 km || 
|-id=975 bgcolor=#fefefe
| 362975 ||  || — || August 23, 2007 || Kitt Peak || Spacewatch || — || align=right data-sort-value="0.98" | 980 m || 
|-id=976 bgcolor=#C2FFFF
| 362976 ||  || — || September 5, 2008 || Kitt Peak || Spacewatch || L4 || align=right | 11 km || 
|-id=977 bgcolor=#E9E9E9
| 362977 ||  || — || November 2, 2007 || Kitt Peak || Spacewatch || JUN || align=right | 1.3 km || 
|-id=978 bgcolor=#E9E9E9
| 362978 ||  || — || November 26, 2003 || Kitt Peak || Spacewatch || ADE || align=right | 2.4 km || 
|-id=979 bgcolor=#d6d6d6
| 362979 ||  || — || March 29, 2004 || Kitt Peak || Spacewatch || BRA || align=right | 2.2 km || 
|-id=980 bgcolor=#fefefe
| 362980 ||  || — || December 30, 2005 || Mount Lemmon || Mount Lemmon Survey || — || align=right | 1.3 km || 
|-id=981 bgcolor=#C2FFFF
| 362981 ||  || — || January 16, 2010 || WISE || WISE || L4 || align=right | 16 km || 
|-id=982 bgcolor=#C2FFFF
| 362982 ||  || — || November 6, 2010 || Catalina || CSS || L4 || align=right | 8.8 km || 
|-id=983 bgcolor=#d6d6d6
| 362983 ||  || — || March 4, 2002 || Kitt Peak || Spacewatch || — || align=right | 2.8 km || 
|-id=984 bgcolor=#fefefe
| 362984 ||  || — || November 8, 2008 || Mount Lemmon || Mount Lemmon Survey || — || align=right data-sort-value="0.71" | 710 m || 
|-id=985 bgcolor=#E9E9E9
| 362985 ||  || — || September 26, 2006 || Kitt Peak || Spacewatch || — || align=right | 2.1 km || 
|-id=986 bgcolor=#E9E9E9
| 362986 ||  || — || March 2, 2009 || Mount Lemmon || Mount Lemmon Survey || — || align=right | 2.8 km || 
|-id=987 bgcolor=#d6d6d6
| 362987 ||  || — || June 4, 2003 || Kitt Peak || Spacewatch || TIR || align=right | 3.5 km || 
|-id=988 bgcolor=#d6d6d6
| 362988 ||  || — || February 12, 2008 || Mount Lemmon || Mount Lemmon Survey || — || align=right | 3.2 km || 
|-id=989 bgcolor=#fefefe
| 362989 ||  || — || December 22, 2008 || Kitt Peak || Spacewatch || MAS || align=right data-sort-value="0.68" | 680 m || 
|-id=990 bgcolor=#fefefe
| 362990 ||  || — || September 28, 2003 || Kitt Peak || Spacewatch || — || align=right | 1.0 km || 
|-id=991 bgcolor=#d6d6d6
| 362991 ||  || — || January 19, 2008 || Mount Lemmon || Mount Lemmon Survey || — || align=right | 3.9 km || 
|-id=992 bgcolor=#E9E9E9
| 362992 ||  || — || October 23, 2003 || Apache Point || SDSS || EUN || align=right | 1.4 km || 
|-id=993 bgcolor=#d6d6d6
| 362993 ||  || — || September 7, 2004 || Kitt Peak || Spacewatch || — || align=right | 4.3 km || 
|-id=994 bgcolor=#E9E9E9
| 362994 ||  || — || October 29, 2002 || Apache Point || SDSS || — || align=right | 2.1 km || 
|-id=995 bgcolor=#E9E9E9
| 362995 ||  || — || August 19, 2001 || Cerro Tololo || M. W. Buie || AGN || align=right | 1.5 km || 
|-id=996 bgcolor=#E9E9E9
| 362996 ||  || — || March 11, 2005 || Mount Lemmon || Mount Lemmon Survey || — || align=right | 1.3 km || 
|-id=997 bgcolor=#fefefe
| 362997 ||  || — || September 15, 1993 || Kitt Peak || Spacewatch || V || align=right data-sort-value="0.70" | 700 m || 
|-id=998 bgcolor=#E9E9E9
| 362998 ||  || — || August 18, 2006 || Kitt Peak || Spacewatch || — || align=right | 2.1 km || 
|-id=999 bgcolor=#d6d6d6
| 362999 ||  || — || February 13, 2002 || Apache Point || SDSS || — || align=right | 3.0 km || 
|-id=000 bgcolor=#d6d6d6
| 363000 ||  || — || February 27, 2003 || Campo Imperatore || CINEOS || — || align=right | 3.0 km || 
|}

References

External links 
 Discovery Circumstances: Numbered Minor Planets (360001)–(365000) (IAU Minor Planet Center)

0362